= William Hartnell =

English actor (1908–1975)

- Hartnell in 1945
- Born: William Henry Hartnell; 8 January 1908; St Pancras, London, England
- Died: 23 April 1975 (aged 67); Coxheath, Kent, England
- Education: Italia Conti Drama School
- Occupation: Actor
- Years active: 1923–1973
- Known for: First Doctor in Doctor Who
- Spouse: Heather McIntyre (m. 1929)
- Children: 1
- Relatives: Norman Hartnell (cousin)
- Military service
- Allegiance: United Kingdom
- Branch: British Army
- Service years: 1940–1941
- Rank: Trooper
- Service number: 7920420
- Unit: 22nd Dragoons

William Henry Hartnell (/ˈhɑːrtnəl/; 8 January 1908 – 23 April 1975) was an English actor, best remembered for his portrayal of the first incarnation of the Doctor in Doctor Who from 1963 to 1966. He began his career with stage and comedy work, then became known for tough military roles, including in the television sitcom The Army Game (1957–1961) and the film Carry On Sergeant (1958). He won lasting acclaim for his performance as the Doctor, who became one of the most popular and iconic characters in British television history.

Born in St Pancras, London, to a single mother, Hartnell had a difficult and problematic childhood. As a teenager, he lived with Hugh Blaker, who paid for his training at a drama school and helped secure work with Frank Benson's company in 1925. He acted in several plays, touring around theatres in England and Canada, where he met his future wife, Heather McIntyre, with whom he had a daughter. After minor appearances in British films, Hartnell secured lead roles in "quota quickies" in the 1930s, gaining attention for his comedic performances in films like Follow the Lady and I'm an Explosive (both 1933).

After a brief stint in the army, Hartnell returned to acting, including in the play Brighton Rock (1942) and its 1948 film adaptation. The play led to his breakthrough role as a sergeant in The Way Ahead (1944), which prompted leading roles like Murder in Reverse (1945) and Appointment with Crime (1946). He returned to the stage in Seagulls Over Sorrento, which ran for more than 1,500 West End performances from 1950 to 1954. Hartnell received several military roles in the 1950s, including in Yangtse Incident: The Story of H.M.S. Amethyst (1957) and The Mouse That Roared (1959), though he also played more sympathetic characters in works like Probation Officer (1960) and This Sporting Life (1963).

This Sporting Life caught the attention of Verity Lambert, who felt Hartnell's eccentricity made him an appropriate fit for the Doctor, the enigmatic protagonist of Doctor Who, in 1963. He was committed to the character, who adopted several of his own idiosyncrasies, and the programme became popular among children. Hartnell encountered difficulties with Lambert's successors, and his health issues from arteriosclerosis prompted him to leave the programme in 1966. After a few more television and theatre roles, he stopped acting due to poor health. He reprised his role as the Doctor alongside his successors in The Three Doctors (1972–1973), his final acting work before his death in 1975 at the age of 67.

== Early life ==
William Henry Hartnell was born on 8 January 1908, at 24 Regent Square in St Pancras, London, England. (Note: In interviews, Hartnell often claimed to be born in Seaton, Devon, and said he was the son of a soldier-turned-stockbroker or a dairy farmer whose family business dated back 300 years. His granddaughter suggested this was to hide his illegitimacy.) His mother, Lucy Hartnell, (Note: Lucy Hartnell was born in January 1884. Her death certificate does not exist, but it is known that she was alive in 1930 and died before April 1932.) was unmarried; Hartnell never discovered his father's identity, despite efforts to trace him. Lucy worked as a commercial clerk. Hartnell struggled to remember details of his early life, instead relying on the words of others, and public information was largely unknown until after his death. He lived with his mother as a child before being unofficially fostered by the age of six by the Harris family in Camden, London. He called Mrs Harris "granny" and described her as "kind as an angel". Hartnell attended St Michael's Primary School, located a few streets away from where he lived. He often shoplifted as a child, pocketing the coins he was given to purchase groceries. His favourite pastime was "bunking" into a cinema with a friend; he particularly enjoyed the films of Pearl White and Charlie Chaplin. He was close to his Aunt Bessie and spent some school holidays with her in Devon.

Hartnell was born, and lived for years, in Regent Square, London (pictured in 2017).

Hartnell spent the summer with Bessie around the age of 10 or 11 before his uncle sent him to live with Lucy in Holborn after getting into trouble. He attended St John's School near Red Lion Square, where he was initially successful but became increasingly problematic. When his mother began to struggle financially, she took out her worries on Hartnell, throwing objects and hitting him. One of her boyfriends—a police officer—stopped her outbursts and supported Hartnell; he respected the man greatly, referring to him as his father and agreeing to improve his behaviour. After the relationship ended, Hartnell's mother's outbursts continued and he fell back into his old ways. Hartnell developed philosophical thoughts by 15, writing in his diary about the unfairness of life. He left school around this time without prospects, and wrote of being "turned out of the house".

At the age of 16, Hartnell met the art collector Hugh Blaker, who encountered him flyweight boxing in King's Cross and later became his unofficial guardian. Blaker offered him a home and helped him secure a job as a stable lad for horse racing jockey Frank Wootton in 1922; within a year, Wootton felt Hartnell could not become a jockey as he had grown too much. While working for Wootton, Hartnell received a scar: after he fell and was kicked by a horse, disinfectant was applied to the open wound but it was unsuitable for first aid and caused blisters, resulting in a more serious wound. The scar remained visible throughout his life and required makeup to conceal. Hartnell retained his enthusiasm for horses and horse racing and always hoped to use his skills in films. Blaker paid for Hartnell's training at the Italia Conti Drama School; he started in late 1923 and attended at the same time as Jack Hawkins, Barry and Roger Livesey, and Frederick Peisley. The school's founder, Italia Conti, believed Hartnell possessed stage talent and agreed with Blaker that sending him to a boarding school would assist with disciplining him. Blaker selected the Imperial Service College; Hartnell began in late 1924 but soon ran away after finding it too strict and struggling to fit in.

== Career ==
=== Early career (1923–1943) ===
Hartnell was first credited as "Billie Pickles" for playing a dog in a pantomime in 1923.

Hartnell's first stage appearance, as part of the Italia Conti Drama School, was as a dog in the pantomime The Windmill Man at the Victoria Palace from 26 December 1923, for which he was credited as "Billie Pickles" and paid £4.50 per week (equivalent to £237 in 2025). He appeared again in The Littlest Revue, or London Squalling in July 1924, praised by The Sportsman as a "promising comedian" and by The Sketch's J. T. Grein for showing "distinct promise". At Hartnell's insistence, Blaker helped him secure a position as a general stagehand at Sir Frank Benson's Shakespearean Company in 1925. He toured with them for about two years, working backstage and credited under several different names, including William Hartnell, Henry Hartnell, and William Henry. During this time, he frequently worked with Robert Donat, whom he admired and kept in contact with for several years. Hartnell toured in the show Just Married and appeared in several plays—as many as eight in a single week, including Shakespearean plays in 1926 like The Merchant of Venice, Julius Caesar, As You Like It, Hamlet, The Tempest, Macbeth, as well as non-Shakespearean plays She Stoops to Conquer and The School for Scandal. In 1927, he appeared in The Best People and was the understudy to Ernest Truex for the lead role in Good Morning, Bill at the Duke of York's Theatre, followed by an extended tour of The Man Responsible, in which The Stage wrote that he "shows particular skill in delineating the two phases of the part".

Hartnell appeared in the short 2LO radio play The Wrong Bus, written by Oliver Baldwin under the pen name Martin Hussingtree; it was broadcast in 1927 and released as a record in 1931. In early 1928, he performed in more shows for Benson's company—Monsieur Beaucaire, Hamlet, The School for Scandal, and The Merchant of Venice—before leaving the company to work in repertory theatre. He later said that he had been earning around £1.25 per week (£68 in 2025) at Benson's company. From March, he understudied Peter Haddon as the lead in Good Morning Bill, stepping in during some performances in April and August, including after Haddon suffered a heart attack mid-show; The Stage called his performance "excellent". and the Liverpool Echo enjoyed his "unnatural restraint". Hartnell was cast by Gordon McLeod for a Canadian tour in 1928; the company travelled on the SS Metagama from 30 August to 8 September. Hartnell performed in Miss Elizabeth's Prisoner from September to November 1928, and in A Bill of Divorcement from November 1928 to February 1929. In both plays, he performed alongside Heather McIntyre, whom he started dating. (Note: Heather McIntyre later recalled that they were dating before the Canadian tour, during which they shared a joint salary as a couple, though their granddaughter said that they fell in love during the tour itself.) They were both praised for their work in local reviews; The Winnipeg Evening Tribune's Nathan B. Zimmerman called Hartnell "a personification of pleasing young British manhood", and the Edmonton Bulletin lauded McIntyre's "most excellent and memorable performance", for which she received a prolonged standing ovation.

Hartnell performed in 77 Park Lane alongside his wife, Heather McIntyre (pictured in 1929).

Outside of their work, Hartnell and McIntyre visited several tourist hotspots, including Chaudière Falls, Mount McKay, Niagara Falls, and the Rocky Mountains. Hartnell found the tour thrilling but missed home; he wrote to his mother almost every other day despite their earlier difficulties, and he often sent cards to his Aunt Bessie, as well as occasionally to Blaker. Around this time, Hartnell's mother lived next door to Blaker, likely acting as his housekeeper. After returning home from Canada in February 1929, Hartnell toured in The Lad in April and May. Hartnell and Heather married in May and performed together in 77 Park Lane; Heather left the performance after eight weeks due to her pregnancy, but Hartnell continued touring. The Stage wrote that Hartnell was "capable" in "a trying part which he presents a good conception of its requirements", while the Evening Express found that Hartnell "gives an excellent impression of remorse and fear" and the Eastern Daily Press felt he "faithfully portrays" the role, "a difficult part to act, as he has no opportunity of showing variety of mood". He was constantly searching for work around this time and appeared in several shows, including The Ugly Duchess in May 1930, for which he was praised by Star's A. E. Wilson and The Sketch's Grein, and The Passing of the Essenes in October. He starred in The Man Who Changed His Name in early 1931, for which he earned a few pound sterling per week; The Stage found his performance "amusing".

With theatre providing low pay, Hartnell and Heather discussed moving to Hollywood but figured their talents were better suited to the British film industry. (Note: Hartnell later regretted his decision not to star in more Hollywood films due to difficulties with the British film industry.) Hartnell faced difficulty entering the industry, initially only securing uncredited walk-on roles: The Unwritten Law (1929), The School for Scandal (1930), A Man of Mayfair (1931), and Diamond Cut Diamond (1932). His first broadcast credit came in a Chinese Moon Party radio play titled A Landscape in Lacquer (1931), and he soon had a minor speaking role in the film Say It With Music and a more significant one in That Night in London (both 1932), the latter of which starred Donat. He continued to perform in theatre around this time, playing the lead in a revival of The Young Idea (1931) by Noël Coward, whom Hartnell and Heather admired and whose shows they often attended. The revival was poorly received and closed shortly thereafter; some critics noted that Hartnell and his co-star Gwen Wyndham were too old for their young characters, though they received praise for their humour and for "preserv[ing] the proper touch throughout". Hartnell's first West End theatre performance was in Maurice Rostand's The Man I Killed (1932), for which critics praised his humorous and clever work. This was followed later that year by his performance in Not So Green, which critics enjoyed, and in the British recast of George Bernard Shaw's Too True to Be Good, which had previously toured in the United States with a different cast; it received some praise but confused West End audiences and was short-lived. Shaw, known for being meticulous, praised Hartnell's performance in a letter to him.

Hartnell and Heather spent 1934 and 1935 working at the Richmond Theatre, near their home. Plays were performed twice nightly, beginning with While Parents Sleep in September 1934; the Richmond and Twickenham Times described Hartnell's performance as "a good representation of a young man torn between his official duties and his emotional desires". This was followed by Behold, We Live in September, and Good Morning, Bill in October, a role with which Hartnell was familiar. The Surrey Comet praised Hartnell's performance in the latter, describing his scenes as the play's funniest. Heather joined Hartnell for The Brontës in October, for which the local Thames Valley newspaper wrote Hartnell "exploits the role to its fullest extent" and the Daily Mirror felt that Hartnell and Heather "are more than ordinarily talented". Hartnell returned as a comedy lead for Eliza Comes to Stay later that month—considered the best part by the Richmond Herald, which wrote that Hartnell's performance "could hardly have been improved upon"—followed by Counsellor at Law, for which he was again joined by Heather. They played a married couple in Apron Strings in October and November, receiving praised, and both were dressed in blackface for the period piece The Pursuit of Happiness in November. This was followed by the comedy Nothing but the Truth, in which Hartnell played the lead; the Richmond Herald considered him the standout. He did not join Heather for the next play, Sixteen, for which she received positive reviews, but they appeared together in Indoor Fireworks in December.

Hartnell in a 1935 newspaper article promoting his lead role in Lord Richard in the Pantry

Hartnell enjoyed working in comedy films, credited as "Billy Hartnell", and hoped to emulate one of his heroes, Charlie Chaplin. In film, he secured leading roles in "quota quickies" from Fox Film like comedies Follow the Lady and I'm an Explosive (both 1933), which were praised; Gloucester Journal enjoyed his "excellent characterisation" in the latter, noting he made "full use of the mirth provoking opportunities given to him" and The Era considered him "the most promising English comedian we have seen since Gordon Harker became famous". He later recalled making only £60 (£3,713 in 2025) from I'm an Explosive. Other quota films included thriller The Perfect Flaw (1934) and those from British and Dominions such as The Lure (1933), Seeing Is Believing (1934), and While Parents Sleep (1935); Hartnell had previously played a different role in While Parents Sleep as a play. Critics lauded Hartnell's comedic work despite weak material in The Lure, and they enjoyed the comedic performances in Seeing Is Believing. Hartnell played the lead in the comedy film Swinging the Lead (1935); The Era felt his performance was "hampered by the general feebleness of the thing". He had minor roles in The Guv'nor, Old Faithful, and The Shadow of Mike Emerald (all 1935), the latter two being produced by I'm an Explosive producer George Smith. He was cast in a minor role in the film Parisian Life (1936), the English-language version of the French film La Vie parisienne which was produced simultaneously.

In 1935, Hartnell continued to perform at the Richmond Theatre, mostly alongside Heather, beginning in January with the lead role of Lord Richard in the Pantry for which he received praise; the Richmond Herald called it "a personal triumph" for Hartnell, who "played the part with an extravagance that was irresistible". He continued to play the lead in January and February in Mr Faint-Heart, The Maitlands, and It Pays to Advertise. Following his work in The Ghost Train, Hartnell took a break until April, returning as the lead in Charley's Aunt. He then took time away to star in more "quota quickies"—such as The Crimson Circle and Nothing Like Publicity (both released 1936), the latter being one of his favourite "quickies" which received good reviews—as well as minor roles in films like Midnight at Madame Tussaud's (1936) and Farewell Again (1937). The Walsall Observer described his Midnight at Madame Tussaud's performance as "some acceptable comedy relief". He returned for two more shows at the Richmond Theatre alongside Heather in 1935: White Cargo in September and A Little Bit of Fluff in November. He reprised his roles in Too True to be Good in March 1936 at the Q Theatre, praised by the Middlesex County Times as one of two actors "who seem thoroughly happy and at home in their roles", and in The Ghost Train in April at the Victoria Palace Theatre, praised by The Marylebone Record as one of the "polished performances".

Hartnell in a newspaper article promoting his 1936 performance in Too True to Be Good

He signed a contract with Martin Sabine's London Repertory Company, appearing at the Victoria Palace Theatre in The Greeks Had a Word for It, The Late Christopher Bean, and Family Affairs, all directed by Geoffrey Norman. In October, he appeared as a murder victim in No Exit, "a bright spot in the play" giving a "successful" and "attractively lively performance" according to The Stage, Coventry Herald, and Birmingham Gazette, respectively. He returned to the Richmond Theatre—under new management—one final time, playing the lead in Someone at the Door in April 1937. Hartnell earned £8 per week (£466 in 2025) for appearing in the operetta Paganini in 1937, a role he was proud of as he was working with Charles B. Cochran. This was followed by the musical comedy Take It Easy at the Palace Theatre in September 1937, a brief role in The Amazing Dr. Clitterhouse at the Q Theatre in January 1938, praised by Acton Gazette and Express as the play's "best acting", and the short-lived Power and Glory at the Savoy Theatre in April 1938. In 1938, he secured another contract with Cochran as understudy to Bud Flanagan in Happy Returns, which he found prestigious as he considered Flanagan one of his heroes. He was paid £7 per week (£407 in 2025) for the role. In periods out of work, Hartnell spent much of his time writing plays (sometimes with Heather), which he sent to theatres attempting to get them produced; they were mostly thrillers or comedies, with titles like Captain's Case and Mail Baggery.

After a minor role in They Drive by Night (1938), Hartnell wrote to Donat asking for assistance, having become frustrated being relegated to cameo roles outside of "quota quickies", but nothing came of it. He had two more minor roles for First National Pictures: Too Dangerous to Live and Murder Will Out (both 1939), receiving positive reviews for his comedic performance in the latter. Hartnell filled in for the lead actor of The Second Man at the Sheffield Repertory Theatre in July 1939, learning his lines in under 48 hours. The Telegraph and Independent congratulated him on the achievement, praising "the life and spirit he put into it", and The Star noted he "gave an exceptionally capable performance in a difficult role"; conversely, the South Yorkshire Times felt he "had not quite the requisite flair" for the part but "did splendidly" considering the circumstances, particularly in the comedic scenes. Around this time, Hartnell began to be represented by Eric L'Epine Smith; however, before long, Smith changed careers to become a casting director for Warner Bros., which frustrated Hartnell. Smith introduced him to Al Parker, who became his agent until the early 1950s. Smith cast Hartnell and Heather in Faithfully Yours, a play he had co-written with Brandon Fleming, which toured in late 1939; critics enjoyed his comedic work, which the South Wales Evening Post lauded as "outstanding among the smaller parts". Hartnell was also the stage manager. In 1940, he appeared in the play Nap Hand, in which he proudly understudied Ralph Lynn, and returned to The Ghost Train in September, receiving praise.

According to Heather years later, Hartnell had been due to sign a contract with Warner Bros. Pictures to star in Hollywood films while she lived in New York, but this was prevented by the onset of World War II. Hartnell attempted to volunteer for the Royal Air Force, partly influenced by Heather's brother, Malcolm; however, he was told they were only taking men under 30 at the time. He lived with Heather in Harrogate while waiting to be called for the army. He joined the White Rose Players for a few shows in the meantime, playing in What Anne Brought Home alongside Heather in the lead role; the Harrogate Advertiser wrote that he "imbued [the character] with life and interest", while Heather "gave a well-balanced study". Before long, Hartnell was called up to the British Army on 10 October 1940, joining the 22nd Dragoons of the Royal Armoured Corps. His training was spent in Devon and Durham. Though he was patriotic, Hartnell hated the army; he found the discipline difficult and struggled with the thought of killing someone, though he was considered a good shot. Heather said that Hartnell served on the East Coast and witnessed bombings during his brief service. He suffered from irritable bowel syndrome and dermatitis, and after undergoing a minor nervous breakdown, he was admitted to Durham Military Hospital before being discharged from the army on 1 July 1941, having served 258 days. He was ill in hospital for several months, and soon developed a stutter. Hartnell's discharge papers described his rank as Trooper and noted, while his conduct was good and reliable, he was deemed permanently unfit for military service. His service number was 7920420. He later felt his military experience helped with his sergeant roles.

Hartnell returned as a guest artist in What Anne Brought Home in September 1941. He produced a show called French Mustard, which was performed in aid of the Soldiers', Sailors' and Airmen's Families Association. He also wrote a stand-up routine in 1942 which he performed at several events, including at Teddington Studios in November in support of the Merchant Navy Comforts Service Fund. He took comedy seriously, and once said he would have attempted professional comedy if acting had not been successful. Smith secured Hartnell a dual role in Flying Fortress in 1941, which required heavy makeup and a moustache, and They Flew Alone in 1942. According to producer Norman Spencer, Hartnell was cast in Noël Coward's film In Which We Serve (1942) but was fired for arriving late on the first day after being verbally reprimanded in front of the cast and crew; his role was given to a unit production manager, Michael Anderson. Hartnell starred in several other films in 1942: Sabotage at Sea for British National Films Company, for which he would later star in more films; The Peterville Diamond for First National; Suspected Person, for which he provided a naturalistic performance; and The Goose Steps Out for Ealing Studios. He starred in another Ealing Studios film, The Bells Go Down, the following year, in which the Surrey Mirror felt he "did so well". He later felt Sabotage at Sea had changed his career trajectory, though he vowed not to use such heavy makeup again.

=== Breakthrough roles (1943–1963) ===
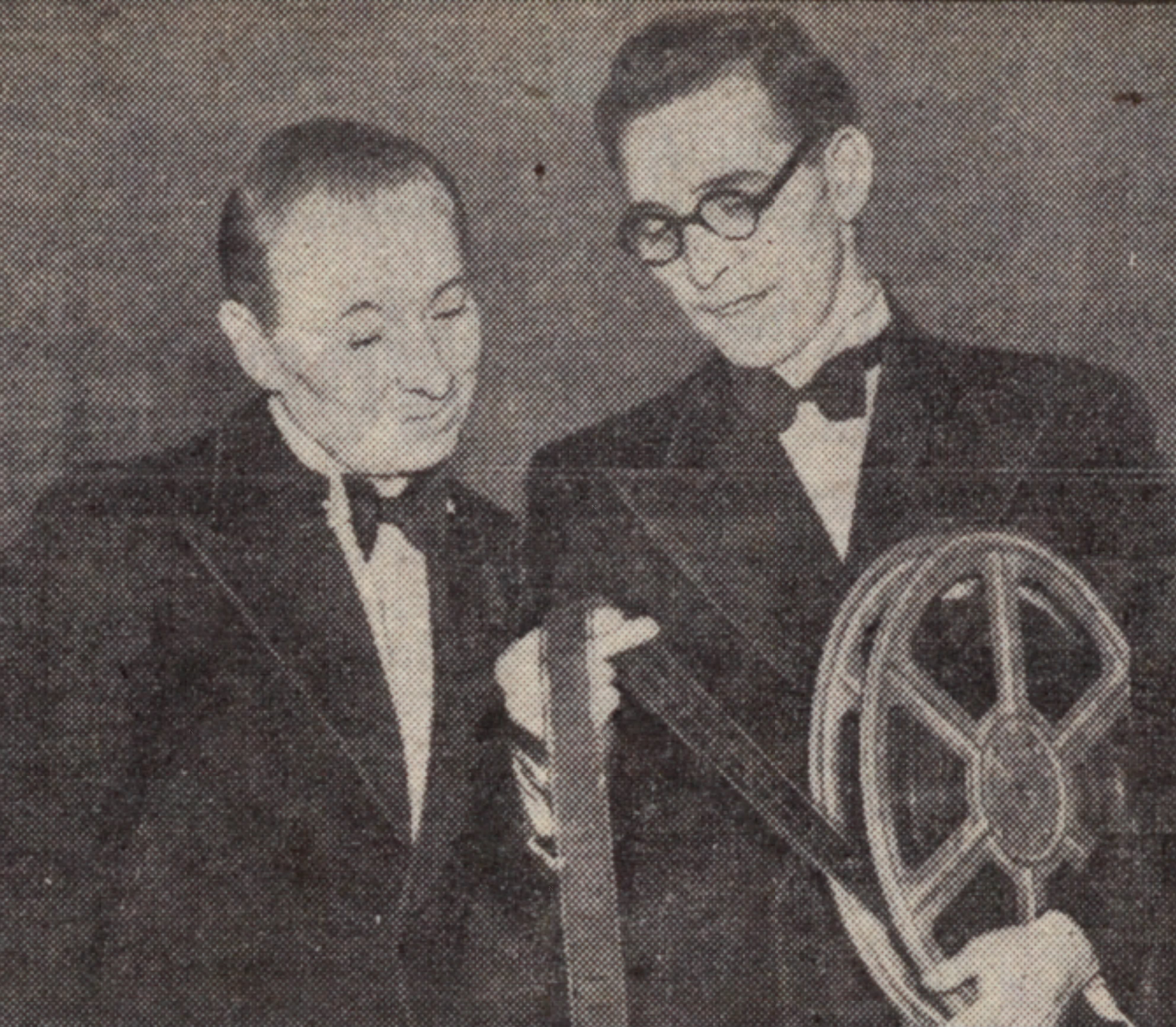
Hartnell promoting Murder in Reverse (left) and Appointment with Crime (right) in cinemas in 1945 and 1946, respectively

In late 1942, Hartnell was cast as Dallow in the play Brighton Rock, led by Richard Attenborough. Attenborough recalled Hartnell as keeping to himself on tour, bringing a sense of reality to his work. Peter Noble described Hartnell's work as "excellent", and The Manchester Guardian found it "commendable" and "thoroughly well drawn". The show had a limited run on the West End as Attenborough was called up by the Royal Air Force. Within the audience at one show was Carol Reed, who subsequently cast Hartnell in his film The Way Ahead (1944) as Sergeant Ned Fletcher. To prepare for the role, Hartnell attended training at Pirbright Camp, watching and speaking to sergeants; after two or three weeks, he took new recruits for their first training session. He subsequently lost his voice due to giving orders, resulting in a filming pause. Critics praised his performance; Daily Herald's P. L. Mannock wrote that he "nearly steals the film", and critics like Basil Wright considered Hartnell's role so convincing that several viewers were shocked he was not a sergeant. Several American publications lauded his supporting role; Oakland Tribune's Wood Soanes felt Hartnell and David Niven "carr[ied] the burden of the drama and give capital performances". It was subsequently considered Hartnell's "big break".

Hartnell starred in several films directed by John Harlow, with whom he became good friends, their families spending Christmas together; their first two collaborations, The Dark Tower and Headline, were released in 1943. Kinematograph Weekly enjoyed his comedic role in the latter. He also had a minor role in San Demetrio London (1943). The Way Ahead's release was withheld until June 1944, shortly after D-Day. Hartnell's performance received "sky high" praise from several critics; the Sunday Express's Ernest Betts called it "the finest study of a soldier I have seen on the screen" and Evening Express's Steve O'Brien wrote that he "shall long remember [Hartnell's] brilliant performance". The role made him a leading actor and led to a contract with British National Films to star in four films, beginning with Harlow's The Agitator (1945); it also starred George Carney, who, after Carney's death, became Hartnell's daughter's father-in-law. Reviewers enjoyed Hartnell's "amusing", "clever", and "worthy" performance; Western Mail's Peter C. Davalle felt it demonstrated that he was "one of Britain's truly big screen personalities", and The Slough Observer found it "a very fine performance which passed almost unnoticed". This was followed by Strawberry Roan and Murder in Reverse (both 1945), both starring a young Petula Clark, who saw Hartnell as an "uncle" figure. The former allowed Hartnell to ride a horse, using skills learned in his childhood, and his performance received positive reviews; Variety wrote that he and Carol Raye "get as much as possible in the leading roles". He was initially announced as a cast member in The Trojan Brothers (1946) as a horse rider.

Hartnell in 1946

Hartnell was praised for his performance in Murder in Reverse, called "a big success" by Sunday Express's Lionel Williams and "a solid portrayal" by Variety, ranging "from helpless indignation to cold vindictiveness". He had several public appearances to promote the film, as well as an article in the magazine Picturegoer. Several journalists questioned why Hartnell's career had not seen more success, due partly to British National's films being shown as second features. His fourth British National film, Appointment with Crime (1946), was written specifically for Hartnell by Harlow; he felt he was an authority on the role—a mean-spirited gangster—as he had spent hours watching spivs in London. He promoted the film with several appearances at cinemas and received positive responses: The Sunday Times's Dilys Powell wrote that he "gives a performance of compact savagery and grim cunning", and Variety felt he "triumphs over characterization improbabilities which would hamstring less competent players". Manchester Evening News's Freda Wynne called him "as good as and a lot better than some Americans we could name"; several journalists considered him the British equivalent of Humphrey Bogart or James Cagney. Conversely, The New York Times's Bosley Crowther felt Hartnell was too strongly attempting to imitate Cagney in Appointment with Crime.

Though he had been associated with comedic roles, he was subsequently seen as more of a serious actor, thereafter credited as "William Hartnell" instead of "Billy"; British National requested the name to accompany his serious characters, though Hartnell was apathetic as long as he received good roles. He sought to play a criminal on a larger scale and expressed an interest in portraying Adolf Hitler, including in Jack Davies's unfunded play The Rat Trap, and Erwin Rommel, feeling he matched his facial characteristics. Hartnell narrated the documentary short film A Defeated People (1946). For his next few films, he was credited as a co-star or lead supporting role: Temptation Harbour, Odd Man Out (both 1947), Escape, and the Boulting brothers' Brighton Rock (both 1948), in which Hartnell reprised his role as Dallow. Hartnell taught Attenborough, who had recently purchased a luxury car, to drive at night after leaving work on Brighton Rock. He made some personal appearances to promote the films. Critics enjoyed his role in Temptation Harbour, though Variety felt he was becoming typecast. The Observer's C. A. Lejeune called him "the acting triumph" of Escape, while The Daily Telegraph's Campbell Dixon found his casting "exactly right" and Variety considered his work "a first-rate, natural performance"; the film also starred Patrick Troughton. Similar praise was directed towards his performances in Odd Man Out and Brighton Rock.

Production of Brighton Rock at the Palace Pier in 1947, with John Boulting, Richard Attenborough, and Carol Marsh

Hartnell turned down a supporting role as a sergeant in The Third Man (1949) as he was protective of his status and sought the lead role, which instead went to Joseph Cotten; he later regretted his decision due to the film's success, especially in the United States. Hartnell began receiving more attention and fan mail around this time; a fan club was established, with several editions of the William Hartnell Bulletin distributed from July 1947. After his roles in Now Barabbas Was a Robber and The Lost People (both 1949), Hartnell began to feel typecast and missed his comedic performances; around 1950, he had some articles published in film magazines expressing his frustration "of being the eternal 'tough guy' of British films". Western Mail's James McKinty called Hartnell "very good as a tough warder" in Now Barabbas, and some reviewers felt he had the best performance in The Lost People, which The Observer's Lejeune called "wholly satisfying". Hartnell made public appearances in events at the time, including presenting prizes at boxing events in West Molesey in 1949 and 1950.

Hartnell in newspaper articles promoting What Anne Brought Home (left) and Double Confession (right) in 1950

Hartnell had fewer theatre experiences after the war. He performed in What Anne Brought Home in 1945, for which he was praised; The Stage felt "his bashfulness and timidity is done naturally, without any sense of forcing and without over-playing". He returned in the same role as a guest artist in 1950, after which he expressed an interest in remaining in theatre instead of films, calling the latter industry "too unsettled, and the work is too restricting". He portrayed characters on opposing sides of the law in films around this time, including as a nasty businessman in Double Confession (1950); Evening Despatch's Roy Gordon felt he "seems a little worried by his part". The director, Ken Annakin, recalled Hartnell "went on the defensive by hamming every scene most aggressively" in response to Peter Lorre's performance; the film's publicity department created newspaper articles promoting a feud between the two actors but clarified they "are quite good friends, and mutual admirers". Hartnell had sought to acquire the play Seagulls Over Sorrento for £500 with Al Parker following its successful showing at the Comedy Theatre in 1949, but was beaten to it. He was instead cast in the play, which proved successful enough to prompt a tour from April to June 1950 before setting up at the Apollo Theatre in the West End for 1,551 performances from June 1950 to February 1954. (Note: Seagulls Over Sorrento was the third-longest-running play of the preceding decade, behind Blithe Spirit (1,997 performances) and Worm's Eye View (1,745).) They also performed for the US Seventh Army in Frankfurt, Germany, in April 1951, to replace the play Mister Roberts.

Hartnell's performance in Seagulls Over Sorrento was praised, both in the early tour and later West End run. New Statesman and Nation's T. C. Worsley described his role as "quite simply, perfection", lauding his mannerisms, and the Birmingham Post called him "an expert with these tight-lipped types". Peter Cushing sent Hartnell a congratulatory letter. Hartnell's understudy was Brian James, who performed for two weeks from 23 May 1950 after Hartnell injured a leg ligament in the previous night's performance, forcing his first ever stage absence. Hartnell was earning £75 per week by 1953 (£1,819 in 2025). Excerpts from the play were broadcast on BBC Light Programme in 1951 and 1952, and televised in May 1953, and the show briefly toured again after its West End run, from February to April 1954. Hartnell was one of four remaining original cast members by that time, which he found tiring, expressing an interest in moving on. He turned down an additional sixteen weeks of performing in Germany, and was replaced by Barry Letts when the show toured in July and by Alec Ross in October.

Hartnell appeared in several films while touring with Seagulls Over Sorrento, including a cameo appearance as a recruiting sergeant in The Magic Box (1951). He researched for his role as a policeman in The Dark Man (1951) by spending time with Criminal Investigation Department officers; his work was filmed on Sundays, following six days performing in Seagulls Over Sorrento. Critics found his performance convincing, especially in contrast to other cast members, and Variety's Harold Myers called it "smooth". Hartnell starred in The Ringer (1952), the directorial debut of Guy Hamilton, Reed's protégé and assistant; Hartnell had several lines cut from the film as he felt the scene would be more effective without them. He did the same in Will Any Gentleman...? (1953), for which he was lauded by the Sunday Graphic. The film also starred Jon Pertwee. Critics enjoyed his performance in The Ringer, and some considered him the standout. He portrayed a soldier in The Holly and the Ivy (1952), filmed during the day before appearing on stage at night, and appeared as a cabman in The Pickwick Papers (1952), filmed over five days during a brief holiday. Around 1952, Hartnell and Heather wrote a thriller play, No Body at Home, which was not produced. In 1953, Hartnell appeared in Gilbert Thomas's radio play The Sea Shall Not Have Them. The following year, he and Heather mounted a play of Rookery Nook at the Sutton Public Hall from 8–9 January to support the National Society for Cancer Relief; the play's author, Ben Travers, provided a programme note for the production.

Hartnell portrayed the lead character in Treble Trouble, a play written by his wife Heather (right), in 1955.

After Seagulls Over Sorrento, Hartnell portrayed the lead character in Heather's play, Treble Trouble, at the Richmond Theatre on 7 March 1955; the Surrey Comet felt Hartnell "displayed a nervousness which was never fully overcome", attributed to Heather's involvement, though The Stage wrote his part was "made-to-measure", deeming him lovable and humorous. Heather wrote the play in six weeks during Hartnell's run in Seagulls Over Sorrento. She first felt it had a chance of success after it made Hartnell laugh; it was later remounted on West End with a different cast and adapted into a film, Home and Away (1956). At the time, according to Hartnell, George Minter had offered him a role in a film adaptation of A Tale of Two Cities. Hartnell had his first television appearances in 1955: in "The Auction", aired in the United States as part of Douglas Fairbanks Presents; and The Inward Eye, a television play broadcast as part of London Playhouse in November 1955, in which he played a guide dog trainer. He visited a guide dog training centre while researching the role, and subsequently championed the Guide Dogs for the Blind Association throughout his life.

He appeared in five films before his next theatre engagement: as a blackmailer in Footsteps in the Fog (1955); as a police inspector in the Boulting brothers' Josephine and Men (1955); as a landowner in the comedy thriller Doublecross (1956); as a sergeant in the successful Boulting brothers' comedy Private's Progress (1956), which reunited him with Attenborough; and in a lead supporting role in Tons of Trouble (1956). He filmed Josephine and Men in the days before working on Treble Trouble; Derby Evening Telegraph's Jim Waters enjoyed the performances but found the screenplay disappointing, and critics enjoyed his work in Private's Progress. Several of his roles since The Ringer had been as the straight man in comedy films. Hartnell returned to theatre in 1956 in the comedy Ring for Catty, which received positive reviews; the Manchester Guardian's Philip Hope-Wallace felt he played "the stern mining Yorkshireman without difficulty, carrying off poor or overwritten scenes with professional polish". He left the role before it moved to the Lyric Theatre in the West End, replaced by Wallas Eaton while Hartnell returned to film production. He appeared in the Errol Flynn Theatre play The Red Geranium (1956).

Hartnell's next film role was as leading seaman Leslie Frank in Yangtse Incident: The Story of H.M.S. Amethyst (1957), recounting the 1949 Amethyst incident. He complained about some of the facilities for actors while filming but otherwise enjoyed his experience and was proud of the work. Bernard Cribbins recalled that his short scene with Hartnell "was a big deal" as he was "a big name" at the time. Hartnell attended the opening at the Plaza Cinema in Worthing, and his performance was praised; Evening Advertiser's Molly Hobman called Hartnell "a great unsinkable of British pictures", giving "one of those unforced, modest yet memorable performances", and The Daily Telegraph's Dixon wrote that Hartnell, "never known to give a bad performance", performed "with such inner conviction that the very set of his shoulders ... says more than most men's faces". From 1957, Hartnell began appearing regularly on television, beginning with The Army Game, one of the first sitcoms, as Sergeant-Major Percy Bullimore. It was his first proper television work; he was "worried stiff" due to the unpredictability, considering television "an awful medium". The programme was successful, garnering approximately six million viewers by early 1958. His performance was praised; when Hartnell missed a few episodes due to blood poisoning from a horsefly bite, his absence was widely reported, reflecting the programme's popularity, (Note: His granddaughter later called it "possibly the most highly publicised horsefly bite ever".) and Manchester Evening News noted his absence "made it clear how much the programme owes to Hartnell's twinkling-eyed tyranny". His co-star Norman Rossington recalled Hartnell's intensity was appropriate for the role but could often be seen off-screen. He appeared in the programme's first series, and at one point attempted to contribute to scripts.

Hartnell was busy with several jobs in the late 1950s, including four films in 1957: as a depot manager in Hell Drivers, lauded for his realism; as a policeman in The Hypnotist, filmed during the day before performing in Ring for Catty; as a safe-breaker in Date with Disaster; and in the television film A Santa for Christmas. He appeared in the film On the Run in 1958 and several episodes of Dial 999 in 1958 and 1959, including the pilot alongside former co-stars Robert Beatty (Appointment with Crime) and Bill Fraser (The Army Game); Birmingham Weekly Post's Colin Yorke questioned if Hartnell's performance would resemble Bullimore. Hartnell took a six-week break from The Army Game to star in Carry On Sergeant (1958), the first film in the Carry On franchise, for which he received top billing as Sergeant Grimshawe; he was reunited with Rossington and Charles Hawtrey from The Army Game. He earned £2,000 (£40,723 in 2025) for his work on the film. While still a figure of authority, the role allowed him to play a softer side. Several critics lauded the realism and humour, and John Waterman called it "his definitive performance", though The Daily Telegraph's Dixon found him "a sad human being lost in a charade" despite his convincing appearance. The screenwriter, Norman Hudis, considered Hartnell "clever" for understanding Grimshawe's inarticulate sentimentality, hence his silence in the film's ending. Hartnell did not return in later Carry On films, likely to avoid typecasting. He returned to The Army Game until the end of the first series in 1958 before leaving the role, citing creative disagreements, poor scripts, and insufficient budgets. He sought more film roles, and had three already contracted.

He had a small, one-day role as a sergeant in Shake Hands with the Devil (1959), working alongside James Cagney, whom he greatly admired, and helping Don Murray with his Cockney accent. Shortly afterwards, Hartnell appeared alongside Peter Sellers in The Mouse That Roared (1959), for which he made public appearances; Evening Standard's Iain Crawford felt that Hartnell, David Kossoff, and Jean Seberg had little to do, "but they do it very well". He appeared with Brian Rix in The Night We Dropped a Clanger (1959) and And the Same to You (1960), and worked on three minor crime dramas in quick succession: portraying a factory manager in Strictly Confidential (1959), a jewel thief in The Desperate Man (1959), and a policeman in Jackpot (1960). The Surrey Comet felt Hartnell's performance added authenticity and excitement to The Desperate Man. He appreciated non-sergeant roles, noting that others had referred to him as "Sarge" so often that he "might as well be back in the forces once again", though he was not as bothered about being typecast. He was cast as a retired safe-cracker in Piccadilly Third Stop (1960), for which he requested that his character was a fisherman, inspired by a newspaper story of a gangster-turned-fisherman. One reviewer called his appearance "superb" and Variety's Richard Gold considered Hartnell the film's best male performance.

Hartnell began transitioning more to television in 1960, including an episode of The Flying Doctor. He was recognised by several dockworkers when filming Probation Officer ; he enjoyed his role as a likeable merchant seaman but hoped for more civilian characters, feeling producers "just don't see me playing a role out of uniform". He similarly enjoyed his sympathetic role as a bricklayer in the ITV Television Playhouse play A Place of My Own, noting "It's been nice to show that I am not a chap who can play only sergeants"; a building foreman taught him how to lay bricks for the role, praised as "meticulously realised" by The Daily Telegraph's A. V. Coton and "thoughtful" by News Chronicle's Philip Purser. Manchester Evening News felt Hartnell "stole most scenes" of his second Television Playhouse play, After the Party, "with a finely graded performance"; Hartnell thought the play accurately reflected Northern England, based on his tour experiences in the region, though the Evening Advertiser criticised the northern accents. Many viewers had sought Hartnell's return to The Army Game since his departure; with Fraser and Alfie Bass leaving for the spin-off series Bootsie and Snudge, Hartnell returned for The Army Game's fourth and final series from 1960 to 1961 after a chance encounter with the programme's producer, before working on an episode of Ghost Squad (1961). Shortly after agreeing to return to The Army Game, Hartnell said he was offered a role in a Hollywood film with Danny Kaye.

After a quiet period, Hartnell was set to return to the theatre in Alas, Poor Fred and A Sort of Accident in October 1961 but fell ill with influenza; he was replaced by Frank Finlay in the former and understudy Patrick Blackwell in the latter. He returned for a limited run of The Cupboard from November to December 1961, which received some praise, before working on three films in 1962, all released in 1963: This Sporting Life, Tomorrow at Ten, and Heavens Above!, the latter alongside Sellers. His supporting role in This Sporting Life was lauded; Illustrated London News's Alan Dent considered it among the strongest. Conversely, Dent felt talented actors like Hartnell were wasted in Heavens Above! in "short and quite unworthy parts". Heather appeared as Mary in a Passion Play performance at Mayfield Memorial Hall in April 1962. Hartnell preferred television to film work, enjoying the stricter nature. His final film roles were recorded and released in 1963: as the lead character's father in The World Ten Times Over, and as a police inspector in To Have and to Hold. Variety's Gold lauded Hartnell's scenes in the former with Sylvia Syms and Huddersfield Daily Examiner's Francis Koval called his work "a splendid performance", though The Daily Telegraph's Patrick Gibbs felt he was miscast. Hartnell appeared in an episode of The Plane Makers in May 1963, which Western Daily Press's Peter Forth praised for being "as good a performance ... as he has done that of non-commissioned officers in so many films and television shows", before several months without work. (Note: According to Maureen O'Brien, Hartnell felt his performance in This Sporting Life demonstrated his abilities outside of comedic and sergeant roles, and he thought it would attract more successful opportunities. O'Brien felt the subsequent lack of opportunities made Hartnell more bitter, determined to take Doctor Who more seriously.)

=== Doctor Who (1963–1966) ===
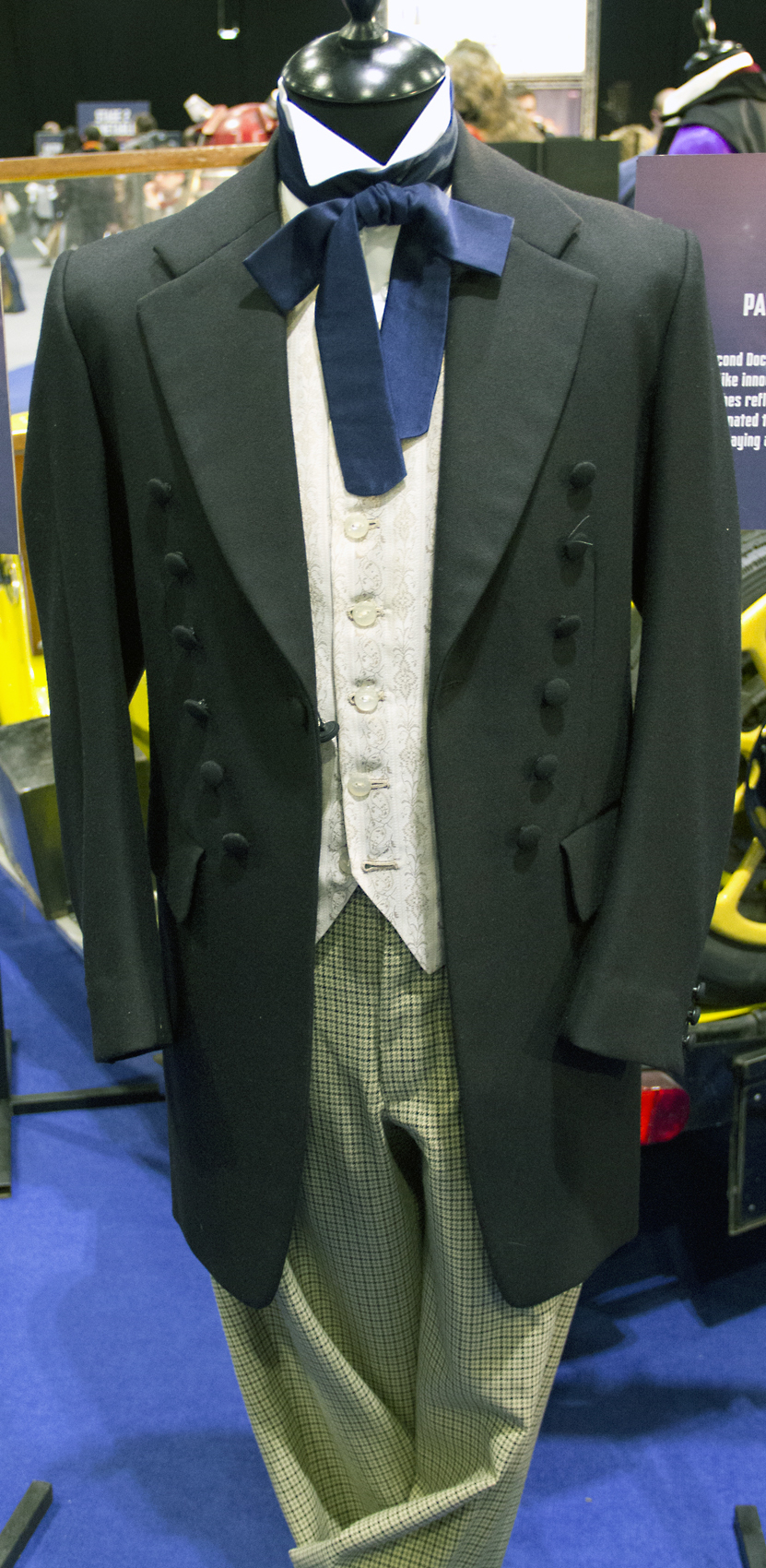
The costume worn by Hartnell as the Doctor, on display in 2013

Hartnell hoped that his work in This Sporting Life would prove that he was capable of roles beyond tough sergeants, for which he became known thanks to performances like The Army Game; he had hoped to return to William Shakespeare's plays to portray characters like Polonius and Shylock. On 12 July 1963, he met with Verity Lambert and Waris Hussein, the producer and director assigned by Sydney Newman with the creation of the BBC's upcoming science fiction television series Doctor Who. Lambert felt Hartnell's eccentric performance in This Sporting Life, as well as his toughness in other roles, made him an appropriate fit for the Doctor, the enigmatic protagonist of Doctor Who. A children's television programme was an unusual suggestion for Hartnell but his agent felt that "it sounds the sort of character part you have been longing to play". Hartnell appreciated Lambert and Hussein's confidence and became close to them; though he was initially reluctant, Hartnell accepted the role after several discussions, viewing it as an opportunity to take his career in a new direction and create a layered character. He had always wished to play an older character in his work, having only done so once, and appreciated that Doctor Who allowed him to do so again.

The 55-year-old Hartnell was aged by wearing a long white wig. The first version of the opening episode was recorded at Lime Grove Studios on the evening of 27 September 1963, following a week of rehearsals; however, the recording was bedevilled with technical errors, and it was remounted on 18 October, upon which Hartnell's performance became softer and more comedic, which he had requested initially. Hartnell's weeks were focused around Doctor Who; episodes were rehearsed from Monday to Thursday before recording every Friday. He became committed to the role, which occasionally caused him to appear "difficult" to newcomers, especially those who he felt failed to take the programme seriously; he was particular about recurring details that viewers would notice, such as button placements in the TARDIS, the Doctor's time travelling machine. He acknowledged that the role gave him "a certain neurosis", making him agitated, irritable, and difficult for his wife, though Heather appreciated a lighter role than his sergeant characters as it meant he was generally happier. Hartnell became known for making mistakes while delivering lines during rehearsals and recordings, often reflected in the final episodes; the Doctor's absent-mindedness subsequently became one of his idiosyncrasies, including comedically mistaking the name of one of his companions, Ian Chesterton. Hartnell believed television actors should play close to their face, instead of grander gestures with their body, resulting in the Doctor's trademark movements like holding his hands on his lapels.

Hartnell described the character as "a cross between the Wizard of Oz and Father Christmas". In contrast to his successors, he played the role as a clever but crotchety professor, with more upper-class outfits and mannerisms than his previous roles and own upbringing. The programme became popular among children; Hartnell received significant amounts of fan mail, which were typically handled by Heather, and he often appeared at fêtes and other celebrations, for which he helped to raise money in lieu of an appearance fee. His proudest appearance was as a "VIP guest" at a 1965 display commemorating the Battle of Britain, in which he witnessed thousands of children who "smashed barriers to get near me". Heather recalled crowds of children following him around when he returned home, "almost as if he was the Pied Piper", which always pleased him. He appeared on Junior Points of View twice in 1964 to discuss the programme and defend criticisms of its frightening content, and he ensured the writing did not become too technical to remain appealing to children. Similarly, in the second-season serial The Crusade (1965), he demanded that depictions of sexual relationship between King Richard and his sister Joan be removed, considering it unsuitable for the family programme. The Daleks, one of the programme's villains created by Terry Nation, became a cultural phenomenon; he enjoyed fighting them and admired their popularity, though found their lack of humanity distracting and "difficult to play to", calling them "overplayed and ... too mechanical".

Hartnell was initially contracted for the pilot episode in July 1963, renewed for a further eight episodes in October, twelve in November, and sixteen in January 1964, concluding the first production block, during which he earned 200 guineas (£210; £3,719 in 2025) per episode. His agent renegotiated a raise to 250 guineas (£262.50; £4,649 in 2025) for the second production block in August, when his contract was renewed for 13 episodes, followed by another 16 in September and 32 in May 1965. The production team considered replacing Hartnell during The Celestial Toymaker (1966), partly due to his fragile health and conflict with the team; however, before this could be enacted, Hartnell's contract was renewed for 20 episodes on 15 February 1966. Towards the end of the third production block, he was earning £315 (£5,124 in 2025) per episode; he felt more financially stable in Doctor Who than other roles. Hartnell had been interested in portraying a character besides the Doctor; his idea to play the character's evil son went unused but led to Hartnell's dual role as the Doctor and the Abbot of Amboise in The Massacre (1966). Hartnell was credited solely as the Abbot in the second and third episodes, the only time in the show's history in which the Doctor does not receive top billing; per his contract, Hartnell is credited in "Mission to the Unknown" despite not appearing.

Hartnell was upset by cast and crew departures from the programme, starting with Hussein after the fourth serial. He developed a close working relationship with Carole Ann Ford, who portrayed the Doctor's granddaughter, Susan Foreman; on one occasion, after upsetting her due to his overprotectiveness, he apologised profusely and sent her flowers. He was upset when Ford left the programme in 1964, though he maintained a good relationship with her successor, Maureen O'Brien (who portrayed Vicki) as she took her work seriously; she considered him a grandfatherly figure whom she loved, despite having to "laugh him out" of his frequent "apoplectic rages". O'Brien felt Hartnell's role utilised his dangerous, nasty qualities as much as his benign and grandfatherly ones. Hartnell was further upset upon the departure of William Russell and Jacqueline Hill (who played Ian Chesterton and Barbara Wright, respectively) in 1965, leaving him the sole original actor remaining on the series; he and Lambert tried to persuade them to stay. He similarly became close to their successor, Peter Purves (portraying Steven Taylor), whom he had recommended to the producers after enjoying working with Purves as a guest star weeks earlier. When Purves once expressed uncertainty about whether his contract would be renewed, Hartnell told him that he would threaten to leave if it was not.

He was similarly close to Lambert, with whom he rarely had any altercations, and was deeply upset by her departure from the series in July 1965, after which it never felt the same to him. He encountered difficulties with her successor, John Wiles, and threw fake tantrums to scare the production team to obey him; he later admitted to other cast members that he was only joking. The rift between them worsened upon the death of Hartnell's aunt Bessie, the only person from his childhood to whom he was close; citing the tight production schedule, Wiles did not allow Hartnell time off to attend her funeral. He considered the frequent changes in cast members disorienting, and was upset by O'Brien's departure, as she was removed from the programme with little warning. Hartnell's performance as the Doctor received praise; scenes highlighted in retrospective reviews include his monologue at the end of The Dalek Invasion of Earth (1964), his comedic performance alongside Peter Butterworth in The Time Meddler (1965), his dual role and closing monologue in The Massacre, and his comedic work in The Gunfighters (1966). Hartnell appeared on Desert Island Discs in August 1965, (Note: For Desert Island Discs, Hartnell's favourite song was Charlie Chaplin's "A Spring Song" from A King in New York, while his chosen luxury and book were cigarettes and G. M. Trevelyan's The English Social History (1944), respectively. His first seven song choices were Paul Robeson's "Trees", Alexander Borodin's Polovtsian Dances, Beethoven's Violin Sonata No. 9, Albert Arlen's "El Alamein Concerto", Louis Armstrong's "Lawd, You Made the Night Too Long", Rachmaninoff's Piano Concerto No. 2, and Flanagan and Allen's "Underneath the Arches".) for which he was proud, feeling it recognised his industry status.

Wiles's successor, Innes Lloyd, whom Hartnell respected, suggested that the actor depart the role and be replaced at the start of the fourth production block, with the character rejuvenating himself into a younger man. This idea was incorporated into The Tenth Planet, for which Hartnell was contracted in June 1966. Hartnell informed Heather of his departure on 16 July, and it was formally announced on 5 August; Hartnell said he felt "three years in one part is a good innings and it is time for a change", and later said he disagreed with the direction of the programme, feeling "there was too much evil entering into the spirit". Privately, he was deeply upset by his departure, and years later confessed "the events of those last few months are engraved on my heart". Hartnell approved of the casting of his successor, Patrick Troughton, honoured to be replaced by an actor of Troughton's calibre. (Note: Hartnell later said that he disliked the tone of Doctor Who after his departure, though called Troughton "a very, very good actor". He had stopped watching by 1970, calling it "all so different now". Heather recalled that watching new episodes upset Hartnell emotionally, though he was pleased with Troughton's interpretation and was "tickled pink" that the programme remained so successful during Jon Pertwee's tenure.) Hartnell's final episode was recorded on 8 October. The final shot was recorded first; Troughton, noticing that Hartnell was upset and encountering difficulties, treated him sensitively. After recording, a leaving party for Hartnell was held at Lloyd's flat, after which Lloyd drove him home; Lloyd recalled telling Hartnell that he "now can have a rest", to which Hartnell replied, "Yes, I'll be very pleased."

=== After Doctor Who (1966–1973) ===
Shortly after departing Doctor Who, Hartnell booked a pantomime, Puss in Boots, which was performed in late 1966 and early 1967. He was uninterested in pursuing further pantomime performances, considering himself "a legitimate character actor of the theatre and film". His family felt he had become overly familiar with television and was unprepared for the vocal projection necessary in theatre; The Stage's John Kennedy Melling wrote that he "was little heard and little used". Conversely, Western Daily Press's Anthony Slade called him "undoubtedly the star of the show" despite his brief appearance, considering his performance appropriate for the young audience, and the Somerset County Gazette felt he was the primary attraction. Hartnell's first television appearance since Doctor Who was as a sergeant major-turned-rent collector in an episode of No Hiding Place in 1967, for which he was taught some Hindustani by two Indian co-stars, though he faced difficulty in replacing the public's image of him as the Doctor; Scottish Daily Express's James Hastie wrote that he "could not believe" Hartnell "as an irritable retired army sergeant. He is Dr Who." Variety considered Hartnell among the standouts of the supporting cast.

Hartnell and Heather sought to establish Theatrical Holdings Ltd in 1967, hoping to assist in promoting theatrical productions, though it was never achieved, possibly due to failure to receive enough financial backing. Hartnell had a guest appearance in an episode of Softly, Softly in early 1968, which Western Daily Press's Maurice Tasnier lauded for his "excellent characterisation". A few months later, he was cast by Val May in Robert Bolt's play Brother and Sister, performed from May to June at the Bristol Old Vic; Evening Post's John Coe called his performance "interesting", and South Wales Argus's Edard Thonger found he was "necessarily harsh and blunt-edged in order to gain the maximum impact in a brief appearance". Hartnell felt it would be his return to theatre, but he struggled to learn his lines, and May's assistant, John David, felt he did not entirely understand his character. He briefly performed in Lord Arthur Savile's Crime from September 1968, due to be a ten-week tour, but departed after a week, replaced by Dave King. His co-star Amanda Barrie claimed that Hartnell, despite success during rehearsals, stumbled through most lines during performances but refused to quit, forcing the producers to dismiss him with Equity's permission.

Hartnell appeared in two episodes of Life With Johnny, including one based on the parable of the Prodigal Son in January 1969, and in an episode of Crime of Passion in April 1970, his last major television appearance. In 1972, he agreed with Doctor Who producer Barry Letts to reprise his role as the Doctor alongside his successors, Troughton and Pertwee, for the programme's tenth anniversary. Heather subsequently informed Letts that Hartnell's health prohibited him from a regular recording day; the script was altered so his character appeared in an advisory role through the TARDIS's monitor, allowing Hartnell to read his lines from cards instead of memorising them. He recorded the role on 6 November 1972, and Heather felt "he glowed again as if it had taken ten years off his illness". His last work was a photocall at his house alongside Troughton and Pertwee. The serial, The Three Doctors, was broadcast from December 1972 to January 1973. It was Hartnell's final acting work.

== Personal life ==
=== Family ===
Hartnell's family lived on Church Street, Isleworth, in the early 1930s.

Hartnell married Heather McIntyre (Note: Amy Heather Miriam Armstrong McIntyre was born in Glasgow on 27 April 1907 and raised in England, including Boars Hill from the age of eleven. Her mother's cousin was Johnston Forbes-Robertson.) at the Chelsea Registry Office on 9 May 1929. They had fallen in love while touring in Canada the previous year, and Heather was pregnant by April 1929. Heather was upset by her pregnancy as she did not want to stop working; she continued acting during her pregnancy, but soon became less interested in performing and more focused on her unborn child. Her role was replaced after eight weeks on tour. Their daughter, Heather Anne, was born at the Acland Nursing Home on 21 December 1929. Hartnell and Heather moved several times after their daughter's birth, living at Aberdare Gardens, 2 West Bolton Gardens, and 50 Redcliffe Gardens in West London.

In May 1931, they moved to a more permanent home at 2 Brook Gardens in Barnes, London, and later to 55 Church Street, Isleworth, next door to Hugh Blaker. Heather suffered a miscarriage around this time after falling down the stairs when rushing to answer the telephone; she was almost full term with a boy, and her resulting illness led to warnings not to have another child. (Note: Years later, Heather felt Hartnell "should have had a family of about six instead of one daughter. He had a way with children, spoke to them on their own level, never down to them, and they respected him for it.") Hartnell and Heather lived on Church Street for at least six months following Blaker's sudden death in October 1936. Blaker had promised to give Hartnell some paintings, but had not written a will since 1919, before they met, as he considered them bad luck; Blaker's collection went to his sister Jane, who later sold most of them. Hartnell's second cousin was the couturier Norman Hartnell, whom he saw infrequently but occasionally met to obtain clothing for himself and his family. In his private life, Hartnell enjoyed fishing and riding, supported West Ham United F.C., and frequented several pubs.

Hartnell and Heather moved to 9 Randolph Avenue in Maida Vale, then to Warwick Road in Worthing in mid-1939. After the Dunkirk evacuation in 1940, Heather moved Anne to live on a farm in Yorkshire, deeming it was unfeasible for Anne to stay with her while she was performing. After his time in the army, Hartnell and his family moved to Thames Ditton Island around 1943, where they rented a bungalow from Hugh Rennie, Heather's friend from a theatre company. Hartnell enjoyed the island but his nerves had not recovered and his skin condition worsened; he contracted scarlet fever, which required isolation in hospital. He moved alone to Bideford and eventually solved his skin condition, before he and Heather purchased 30 Thames Ditton Island. Heather stopped acting during the war to work in a munitions factory, and by 1948 had retired from performing to focus on Hartnell's secretarial work. Hartnell's infidelity caused problems in his marriage, including a period in which Heather briefly moved away. She sought a divorce around the late 1940s but was unable to provide evidence.

Hartnell's daughter Anne married Terry Carney in October 1952.

Hartnell's daughter, Anne, studied veterinary surgery and became a qualified riding instructress. She married Terence "Terry" Carney on 21 October 1952 at Caxton Hall. Carney, the son of comedian George Carney, was a talent agent; after Carney started working with Eric L'Epine Smith in 1954, Hartnell soon signed with the agency. (Note: Hartnell later introduced other actors to Smith when he felt they were not being well represented, including Maureen O'Brien and Nicholas Courtney.) Hartnell and Heather moved to Brighton in 1955, wanting more space and proximity to their friends like Anita Sharp-Bolster and Winifred Wolfe. After encountering issues with their neighbours, Hartnell and Heather moved a few miles north to Ditchling in March 1957, shortly after adopting a Staffordshire bull terrier named Stumpy. Hartnell and Heather moved again around early 1958 and then three more times in the subsequent year before purchasing Old Mill Cottage in 1959, located about eight miles away from Tunbridge Wells. They had two grandchildren, both born at Brighton General Hospital: Judith Anne Carney on 13 June 1957, and Paul Carney on 9 March 1959. They called Hartnell "Sampa", and several newspapers published photographs of Hartnell and Judith in October 1957.

Heather discovered that Hartnell had been unfaithful again while she was in hospital in August 1962; she tried to resuscitate her career, having stopped working due to her husband's success, though difficult weather prevented her from accepting any roles. He was again unfaithful during the production of Puss in Boots in 1967; Hartnell was prompted to stay with Heather after she showed apathy. He was publicly proud of Heather and her work, and often apologised for his poor behaviour. By 1968, Stumpy was replaced by another Staffordshire bull terrier named Honeybunch. As Hartnell lacked wages and refused to sign up for unemployment benefits, Heather began selling Old Mill Cottage in early 1972, and they rented a nearby cottage in June. Several months later, due in part to Hartnell's worsening health, they moved in to an annex of Anne and Terry's house on Sheephurst Lane in Marden, Kent. Heather continued receiving mail from Doctor Who fans after Hartnell's death, and was invited to attend several celebrations and conventions. She died in December 1984 at the age of 77. Anne died on 14 April 2025 aged 95.

=== Views ===
Hussein called Hartnell a "dyed-in-the-wool" Conservative, initially bewildered by Doctor Who's female producer (Lambert), Indian director (Hussein), and Canadian creator (Newman), though he came to respect and befriend them. Hartnell claimed to dislike foreigners but was friends with many, including Hussein; Val Speyer, Lambert's secretary, said "if he liked someone, they weren't a foreigner, they were a friend". Nicholas Courtney, who guest-starred in Doctor Who, described Hartnell as "quite nationalist-minded, a bit intolerant of other races". His Doctor Who co-star Anneke Wills accused him of prejudice after the casting of black actor Earl Cameron (Note: Cameron's agent was Terry Carney, Hartnell's son-in-law; Cameron suspected he may have introduced them to each other.) as an astronaut in The Tenth Planet, though Cameron said he was not aware of it, and O'Brien recalled his homophobia and racism, particularly against West Indians. Hussein agreed that Hartnell was homophobic but ensured he "never allowed him to think of me as anything other than a director". Some accused Hartnell of antisemitism, apparently based on his belief that Jews were controlling the media; Courtney recalled Hartnell's bigotry and cited an occasion in which he identified another actor as Jewish. Hartnell's granddaughter, however, felt this belief was contradicted on a personal level, citing his friendships with Ford and Lambert. Hartnell was not publicly religious but had "a natural belief there is something or someone great that exists beyond my comprehension"; he did not believe churchgoing was a required duty, preferring only to kneel in an empty church "and say what I have to say".

=== Health and death ===
In May 1961, Hartnell's doctor warned him to limit his alcohol consumption; he initially complied before returning to his old habits. His mistakes while recording Doctor Who have been considered a possible early sign of his arteriosclerosis, an often undetectable disease in its early stages. He smoked heavily and exercised rarely in his later life, worsened by the strain of working on Doctor Who; he suffered several colds while working on the series and developed bronchitis during his last story, forcing his absence from his penultimate episode. By 1969, his arteriosclerosis was impacting him personally and professionally, as he had weaker legs and would often forget his lines; in 1970, he said that he had suffered an eighteen-month illness brought on by pleurisy and a nervous breakdown, which he partly attributed to stress of Doctor Who. After moving in with his daughter in 1972, he became quieter and friendlier, and Heather became his full-time nurse. He spent time at Linton Hospital, Coxheath, in August 1974 and was admitted permanently in December; Heather visited everyday. After eight years of illness and following a series of strokes, Hartnell died in his sleep on 23 April 1975, aged 67. His body was cremated at the Kent and Sussex Crematorium on 28 April.

== Legacy ==
"I think that if I live to be ninety, a little of the magic of Doctor Who will still cling to me!"

— William Hartnell, 1972

After Hartnell's death, Terry Nation said that "the biggest tribute to William Hartnell is that he started a show which is still going on with huge audiences". While Hartnell was known for most of his career for his similar tough sergeant roles, (Note: Philip Gillett noted that Hartnell's supervisory, lonesome sergeant roles was in contrast to his working-class upbringing, demonstrating that "working-class fatalism had no place" in his performances.) his legacy became overshadowed by the popularity of his three-year work on Doctor Who. The character of the Doctor became one of the most popular in British television history, and Hartnell is regularly credited for establishing the character's mythology and the programme's longevity; he acknowledged he was unlikely to "ever escape from the character". The first issue of Doctor Who Weekly in 1979 was dedicated to Hartnell's memory.

Hartnell's granddaughter, Judith, who Hartnell predicted "will probably be a TV producer one day" in 1965, followed the family tradition of acting before becoming a talent agent, taking over her father's agency when he retired in 1995. She became professionally known as Jessica Carney, to comply with Equity's rules, and wrote a biography chronicling Hartnell's life and work, titled Who's There? The Life and Career of William Hartnell. It was published by Virgin Publishing in 1996, and an updated edition was issued by Fantom Publishing for Doctor Who's fiftieth anniversary in 2013, alongside an abridged audiobook version read by Anneke Wills.

Richard Hurndall portrayed Hartnell's incarnation of the Doctor in the twentieth-anniversary special "The Five Doctors" (1983), which opened with a clip of Hartnell's speech from The Dalek Invasion of Earth. A character named "Billy", based on Hartnell, is featured in the Big Finish Productions audio drama Pier Pressure (2006), featuring Colin Baker's Sixth Doctor. Hartnell and Heather were portrayed by David Bradley and Lesley Manville in An Adventure in Space and Time (2013), a dramatisation of the events surrounding Doctor Who's creation to celebrate its fiftieth anniversary, which Carney called "a wonderful tribute". Bradley later portrayed the First Doctor in Doctor Who episodes in 2017 and 2022. Hartnell was honoured with a blue plaque at the BBC's Television Centre in May 2002 (alongside Troughton and Pertwee) and at Ealing Studios in October 2018.

== Acting credits ==
=== Theatre ===
Year(s)	Title	Role	Venue/s	Notes	Ref.
1923–1924	The Windmill Man	Spot the Dog	Victoria Palace	26 December – 26 January; credited as "Billie Pickles"	
1924	The Littlest Revue, or London Squalling	—N/a	Aldwych Theatre	July; credited as "Billy Pickles"	
1926	The Merchant of Venice	Venetian	King's Theatre	30 April	
1926	She Stoops to Conquer / Julius Caesar / As You Like It / Hamlet / The Tempest / The School for Scandal / The Merchant of Venice / Macbeth	Assistant stage manager, walk-on, and prompt	Tour	Sir Frank Benson's Company; credited as "Henry Hartnell"	
1926	Just Married	Ship steward	Tour	September	
1927	The Best People	—N/a	Tour	February – May	
1927	Good Morning, Bill	Bill Paradene	Tour	Understudied Ernest Truex	
1927	The Man Responsible	Dr. Ronald Warden	Tour	29 August – 24 December	
1928	Monsieur Beaucaire / Hamlet / The School for Scandal / The Merchant of Venice	Assistant stage manager and walk-on	Tour	Sir Frank Benson's Company; credited as "William Henry"	
1928	Good Morning, Bill	Bill Paradene	Tour	March – August; understudied Peter Haddon	
1928	Miss Elizabeth's Prisoner	Ltd. Bland / Sgt. Carrington	Tour (Canada)	10 September – 21 November (Note: Credited as "W. Hartnell")	
1928–1929	A Bill of Divorcement	Kit Pumfrey	Tour (Canada)	22 November – 7 February	
1929	The Lad	—N/a	Tour	April	
1929	77 Park Lane	Philip Baynton	Tour	September – November	
1930	The Ugly Duchess	Duke Meinhard	Arts Theatre	15–25 May	
1930	The Passing of the Essenes	Jacob	Arts Theatre	1 October	
1931	The Man Who Changed His Name	Frank O'Ryan	Tour	March	
1931	The Young Idea	Sholto	King's Theatre	October – December	
1932	The Man I Killed	Erik	Apollo Theatre	2 March	
1932	Not So Green	Stephen Forrester	Tour	April – May	
1932	Too True to Be Good	Private Meek	Tour	October	
1934	While Parents Sleep	Neville Hammond	Richmond Theatre	17–22 September (Note: Credited as "Billy Hartnell")	
1934	Behold, We Live	Tony Casenove	Richmond Theatre	24–29 September	
1934	Good Morning, Bill	Bill Paradene	Richmond Theatre	1–6 October	
1934	The Brontës	Branwell	Richmond Theatre	8–13 October	
1934	Eliza Comes to Stay	Sandy Verrall	Richmond Theatre	15–20 October	
1934	Counsellor at Law	Herbert Weinberg	Richmond Theatre	22–27 October	
1934	Apron Strings	Daniel Curtis	Richmond Theatre	29 October – 3 November	
1934	The Pursuit of Happiness	Servant	Richmond Theatre	5–10 November	
1934	Nothing but the Truth	Rob Bennett	Richmond Theatre	12–17 November	
1934	Indoor Fireworks	Pat Swanson	Richmond Theatre	3–8 December	
1935	Lord Richard in the Pantry	Lord Richard	Richmond Theatre	7–12 January	
1935	Mr Faint-Heart	Mr Faint-Heart	Richmond Theatre	21–26 January	
1935	The Maitlands	Roger Maitland	Richmond Theatre	28 January – 2 February	
1935	It Pays to Advertise	Johnson	Richmond Theatre	4–9 February	
1935	The Ghost Train	Teddy Deakin	Richmond Theatre	11–16 February	
1935	Charley's Aunt	Lord Fancourt Babberley	Richmond Theatre	22–27 April	
1935	White Cargo	Langford	Richmond Theatre	23–28 September	
1935	A Little Bit of Fluff	Bertrand Tully	Richmond Theatre	4–9 November	
1936	Too True to Be Good	Private Meek	Q Theatre	2–7 March	
1936	The Greeks Had a Word for It	Louis Small	Victoria Palace Theatre	11–17 April	
1936	The Ghost Train	Teddy Deakin	Victoria Palace Theatre	18–24 April	
1936	The Late Christopher Bean	Tallent	Victoria Palace Theatre	4–9 May	
1936	Family Affairs	Nevil Madehurst	Victoria Palace Theatre	11–16 May	
1936	No Exit	Philip West	Tour	October	
1937	Someone at the Door	Ronnie Martin	Richmond Theatre	3–10 April	
1937	Paganini	Foletto and Ricardo	Lyceum Theatre	20 May – July	
1937	Take It Easy	Willie	Palace Theatre	23 September	
1938	The Amazing Dr. Clitterhouse	Pal Oakie	Q Theatre	January	
1938	Power and Glory	First Journalist	Savoy Theatre	8 April	
1938	Many Happy Returns	Ensemble	Adelphi Theatre	Understudied Bud Flanagan	
1939	The Second Man	Clark Storey	Sheffield Playhouse	Sheffield Repertory Theatre	
1939	Faithfully Yours	Mr Lewis	Tour	27 November – December	
1940	Nap Hand	Customer	Aldwych Theatre	March – April; understudied Ralph Lynn	
1940	The Ghost Train	Teddy Deakin	Dundee Repertory Theatre	15–20 September	
1940	What Anne Brought Home	Douglas Purdie	Grand Opera House	January	
1941	What Anne Brought Home	Douglas Purdie	Leeds Theatre Royal	September	
1943	Brighton Rock	Dallow	Tour	16 February – 6 March	
1943	Brighton Rock	Dallow	Garrick Theatre	11 March – 5 June	
1945	What Anne Brought Home	Douglas Purdie	Q Theatre	4–9 December	
1950	What Anne Brought Home	Douglas Purdie	Royal County Theatre	23–28 January	
1950	What Anne Brought Home	Douglas Purdie	Capitol Theatre	6–11 February	
1950	Seagulls Over Sorrento	Petty Officer Herbert	Tour	April – June	
1950–1954	Seagulls Over Sorrento	Petty Officer Herbert	Apollo Theatre	14 June 1950 – 13 February 1954	
1951	Seagulls Over Sorrento	Petty Officer Herbert	Frankfurt	29 April	
1954	Seagulls Over Sorrento	Petty Officer Herbert	Tour	February – April	
1954	Rookery Nook	Co-director	Sutton Public Hall	8–9 January	
1955	Treble Trouble	George Knowles	Richmond Theatre	March	
1956	Ring for Catty	John Rhodes	Coliseum Theatre	6–12 February	
1956	Ring for Catty	John Rhodes	Lyric Theatre	14 February – 21 April	
1956	Ring for Catty	John Rhodes	Golders Green Hippodrome	23–28 April	
1961	The Cupboard	Alf Thompson	Arts Theatre	15 November – 9 December	
1966–1967	Puss in Boots	Buskin the Cobbler	Tour	December – January	
1968	Brother and Sister	William Brazier	Bristol Old Vic	29 May – 22 June	
1968	Lord Arthur Savile's Crime	Baines	Ashcroft Theatre	9–14 September	

=== Film ===
Year	Title	Role	Notes	Ref.
1929	The Unwritten Law	—N/a	Uncredited	
1930	The School for Scandal	—N/a	Uncredited	
1931	A Man of Mayfair	—N/a	Uncredited	
1932	Diamond Cut Diamond	—N/a	Uncredited	
1932	Say It with Music	—N/a	First speaking role	
1932	That Night in London	—N/a	Uncredited	
1933	Follow the Lady	Mike Martindale	Credited as "Billy Hartnell"	
1933	I'm an Explosive	Edward Whimperley	Credited as "Billy Hartnell"	
1933	The Lure	Billy	Credited as "Billy Hartnell"	
1934	Seeing Is Believing	Ronald Gibson	Credited as "Billy Hartnell"	
1934	The Perfect Flaw	Vickers	Credited as "Billy Hartnell"	
1935	Swinging the Lead	Freddy Fordum	Credited as "Billy Hartnell"	
1935	While Parents Sleep	George	Credited as "Billy Hartnell"	
1935	Old Faithful	—N/a	Uncredited	
1935	The Guv'nor	Car Salesman	Credited as "Billy Hartnell"	
1935	The Shadow of Mike Emerald	—N/a	Uncredited	
1936	La Vie parisienne	—N/a	Uncredited	
1936	The Crimson Circle	—N/a	Uncredited	
1936	Nothing Like Publicity	Pat Spencer	Credited as "Billy Hartnell"	
1936	Midnight at Madame Tussaud's	Stubbs	Credited as "Billy Hartnell"	
1937	Farewell Again	—N/a	Uncredited	
1938	They Drive by Night	Bus Conductor	Credited as "Billy Hartnell"	
1939	Too Dangerous to Live	—N/a	Credited as "Billy Hartnell"	
1939	Murder Will Out	Dick	Credited as "Billy Hartnell"	
1942	Flying Fortress	Gaylord Parker and Nobby	Credited as "Billy Hartnell"	
1942	They Flew Alone	Collie	Credited as "Billy Hartnell"	
1942	Suspected Person	Detective Saunders	Credited as "Billy Hartnell"	
1942	Sabotage at Sea	Digby	Credited as "Billy Hartnell"	
1942	The Peterville Diamond	Joseph	Credited as "Billy Hartnell"	
1942	The Goose Steps Out	German Officer	Credited as "Billy Hartnell"	
1943	The Bells Go Down	Brookes	Credited as "Billy Hartnell"	
1943	The Dark Tower	Towers	Credited as "Billy Hartnell"	
1943	Headline	Dell	Credited as "Billy Hartnell"	
1943	San Demetrio London	—N/a	Uncredited	
1944	The Way Ahead	Sgt Ned Fletcher	Credited as "Billy Hartnell"	
1945	The Agitator	Peter Pettinger	Credited as "Billy Hartnell"	
1945	Strawberry Roan	Chris Lowe	Credited as "Billy Hartnell"	
1945	Murder in Reverse	Tom Masterick		
1946	A Defeated People	Narrator	Documentary short film	
1946	Appointment with Crime	Leo Martin		
1947	Temptation Harbour	Jim Brown		
1947	Odd Man Out	Fencie		
1948	Brighton Rock	Dallow		
1948	Escape	Insp. Harris		
1949	Now Barabbas Was a Robber	Warder Jackson		
1949	The Lost People	Sgt Barnes		
1950	Double Confession	Charlie Durham		
1951	The Dark Man	Superintendent		
1951	The Magic Box	Recruiting Sergeant		
1952	The Ringer	Sam Hackett		
1952	The Pickwick Papers	Irate Cabman		
1952	The Holly and the Ivy	Company Sergeant-Major		
1953	Will Any Gentleman...?	Insp. Martin		
1955	Footsteps in the Fog	Herbert Moresby		
1955	Josephine and Men	Inspector Parsons		
1956	Doublecross	Whiteway		
1956	Private's Progress	Sgt Sutton		
1956	Tons of Trouble	Bert		
1957	Yangtse Incident: The Story of H.M.S. Amethyst	Leading Seaman Frank		
1957	Hell Drivers	Cartley		
1957	The Hypnotist	Insp. Ross		
1957	Date with Disaster	Tracy		
1958	On the Run	Tom Casey		
1958	Carry On Sergeant	Sergeant Grimshawe		
1959	Shake Hands with the Devil	Sergeant Jenkins		
1959	The Mouse That Roared	Will		
1959	The Night We Dropped a Clanger	Sergeant Bright		
1959	Strictly Confidential	Grimshaw		
1959	The Desperate Man	Smith		
1960	And the Same to You	Wally Burton		
1960	Jackpot	Superintendent Frawley		
1960	Piccadilly Third Stop	Colonel		
1963	Tomorrow at Ten	Freddy Maddox		
1963	This Sporting Life	"Dad" Johnson		
1963	Heavens Above!	Major Fowler		
1963	To Have and to Hold	Inspector Roberts		
1963	The World Ten Times Over	Dad		

=== Television ===
Year(s)	Title	Role	Notes	Ref.
1955	Douglas Fairbanks, Jr., Presents	Christy	Season 3, Episode 28: "The Auction"	
1955	London Playhouse	Kenyon	Season 1, Episode 7: The Inward Eye	
1956	The Errol Flynn Theatre	Himself	Season 1, Episode 13: The Red Geranium	
1957	A Santa For Christmas	—N/a	TV movie	
1957–1958	The Army Game	CSM Percy Bullimore	Series 1 (7 episodes)	
1958–1959	Dial 999	Joss Crawford	Season 1, Episode 1: "The Killing Job"	
1958–1959	Dial 999	Jeff Richards	Season 1, Episode 16: "50,000 Hands"	
1959	The Flying Doctor	Abe McKeller	Season 1, Episode 9: "The Changing Plain"	
1960	Probation Officer	Greg Miller	Season 1, Episode 28	
1960	ITV Television Playhouse	Jim	Season 5, Episode 41: A Place of My Own	
1960	ITV Television Playhouse	Jim Houldsworth	Season 5, Episode 44: After the Party	
1960–1961	The Army Game	CSM Percy Bullimore	Series 4 (9 episodes)	
1961	Ghost Squad	Fred Rice	Season 1, Episode 4: "High Wire"	
1963	The Plane Makers	Wally Griggs	Season 1, Episode 15: "One of Those Days"	
1963–1966	Doctor Who	Dr. Who	Season 1 (42 episodes); Season 2 (39 episodes); Season 3 (43 episodes); Season 4 (8 episodes)	
1966	Doctor Who	Abbot of Amboise	Season 3 (2 episodes)	
1964	Junior Points of View	Himself	2 episodes	
1967	No Hiding Place	Impey	Season 10, Episode 2: "The Game"	
1968	Softly, Softly	Henry Swift	Season 3, Episode 13: "Cause of Death"	
1969	Life With Johnny	Dad	Series 1, Episode 2: "Johnny on the Rocks"; Series 1, Episode 3: "Johnny Come Home"	
1970	Crime of Passion	Henri Lindon	Series 1, Episode 6: "Alain"	
1972–1973	Doctor Who	Dr. Who	Season 10 (4 episodes)	

=== Radio ===
Year	Title	Role	Notes	Ref.
1927	The Wrong Bus	John		
1931	Chinese Moon Party	—N/a	Episode: A Landscape in Lacquer	
1953	The Sea Shall Not Have Them	Flight Sergeant Slingsby		
1965	Desert Island Discs	Himself	23 August	

== Sources ==
=== Book and journal sources ===
- Abramson, Abraham, ed. (1970). The New York Times Film Reviews (1913–1968). Vol. 4. The New York Times Company and Arno Press. LCCN 70112777.
- Allan, Angela; Allan, Elkan (1973). The Sunday Times Guide to Movies on Television. Times Newspapers Ltd. ISBN 0-7230-0104-9.
- Annakin, Ken (2001). So You Wanna Be a Director?. Tomahawk press. ISBN 0-953-1926-5-2.
- Baldwin, Oliver (1932). The Questing Beast: An Autobiography. Grayson & Grayson Ltd. NLA 2259400.
- Barrie, Amanda (2003). It's Not a Rehearsal: The Autobiography. Headline Book Publishing. ISBN 0-7553-1123-X.
- Beattie, Keith (2010). Humphrey Jennings. Manchester University Press. ISBN 978-0-719-07855-2.
- Belton, Brian (2006). West Ham United Miscellany. Pennant Books. ISBN 0-9550394-4-4.
- Bergan, Ronald; Burnard, Jane (1990). The Great Theatres of London (2004 ed.). André Deutsch. ISBN 0-233-00066-6.
- Black, Kitty (1984). Upper Circle: A Theatrical Chronicle. Methuen London Ltd. ISBN 0-413-51040-9.
- Brown, Ivor (1956). Theatre 1955–6. Max Reinhardt.
- Brown, J. P. C. (2011). "Doctor Who: A Very British Alien". In Neighbors, R. C.; Rankin, Sandy (eds.). The Galaxy Is Rated G. McFarland & Company. pp. 161–182. ISBN 978-0-786-45875-2.
- Brownlow, Kevin (1996). David Lean: A Biography. St. Martin's Press. ISBN 0-312-14578-0.
- Brunt, David (10 May 2024). The Doctor Who Production Diary: The Hartnell Years. Telos Publishing. ISBN 978-1-845-83222-3.
- Burk, Graeme; Smith?, Robert (2013). Who's 50: The 50 Doctor Who Stories to Watch Before You Die. ECW Press. ISBN 978-1-770-41166-1.
- Butler, Ivan (1973). Cinema in Britain: An Illustrated Survey. A. S. Barnes and Company. ISBN 0-498-01133-X. LCCN 71039836.
- Cabell, Craig (2010). The Doctors: Who's Who. John Blake Publishing. ISBN 978-1-843-58186-4.
- Carney, Jessica (1996). Who's There? The Life and Career of William Hartnell (2013 ed.). Virgin Publishing. ISBN 978-1-85227-514-3.
- Clapham, Mark; Robson, Eddie; Smith, Jim (2005). Who's Next: An Unofficial Guide to Doctor Who. Virgin Books. ISBN 978-0-753-50948-7.
- Codron, Michael; Strachan, Strachan (2010). Putting It On: The West End Theatre of Michael Codron. Duckworth Overlook. ISBN 978-0-715-63944-3.
- Cole, George (2013). The World Was My Lobster: My Autobiography. John Blake Publishing. ISBN 978-1-782-19469-9.
- Courtney, Nicholas; McManus, Michael (2005). Still Getting Away With It: The Life and Times of Nicholas Courtney. SciFiCollector.co.uk. ISBN 1-871330-73-4.
- Cribbins, Bernard (2018). Bernard Who?: 75 Years of Doing Just About Everything. Constable. ISBN 978-1-472-13016-7.
- Cull, Nicholas (2001). "'Bigger on the inside...': Doctor Who as British cultural history". In Roberts, Graham; Taylor, Philip M. (eds.). The Historian, Television and Television History. University of Luton Press. pp. 95–111. ISBN 1-86020-586-0.
- Donnelley, Paul (2000). Fade to Black: A Book of Movie Obituaries. Omnibus Press. ISBN 0-7119-7984-7.
- Gillett, Philip (2003). The British working class in postwar film. Manchester University Press. ISBN 0-7190-6257-8.
- Haining, Peter (1983). Doctor Who: A Celebration. London: W. H. Allen & Co. ISBN 978-0-491-03351-0.
- Haining, Peter (1986). The Doctor Who File. W. H. Allen & Co. ISBN 0-86379-169-7.
- Hewett, Richard (23 July 2020). "Who's in Charge?: Changing Character Agency in Early Doctor Who". International Journal of TV Serial Narratives. 6 (1): 5–16. doi:10.6092/issn.2421-454X/9805. ISSN 2421-454X.
- Hibbin, Sally; Hibbin, Nina (1988). What a Carry On: The Official Story of the Carry On Film Series. Hamlyn. ISBN 0-600-55819-3.
- Higgs, John (2025). Exterminate/Regenerate: The Story of Doctor Who. Hachette UK. ISBN 978-1-399-61479-5.
- Howe, David J.; Walker, Stephen James (1998). Doctor Who: The Television Companion. Vol. 1 (2021 ed.). London: BBC Books. ISBN 978-1-845-83156-1.
- Howe, David J.; Walker, Stephen James; Stammers, Mark (2005). Doctor Who: The Handbook. Vol. 1 (2016 ed.). London: Telos Publishing. ISBN 978-1-845-83941-3.
- Hulke, Malcolm; Dicks, Terrance (1972). The Making of Doctor Who. London: Pan Books. ISBN 0-330-23203-7.
- Kynaston, David (2014). Modernity Britain: 1957–1962. Bloomsbury Publishing. ISBN 978-1-620-40809-4.
- Lovell, Alan; Hillier, Jim (1972). Studies in Documentary. The Viking Press. ISBN 978-0-436-09918-2. LCCN 73162541.
- Mason, Mark (2020). The Book of Seconds: The Incredible Stories of the Ones That Didn't (Quite) Win. London: Weidenfeld & Nicolson. ISBN 978-1-474-60848-0.
- Meyrick, Robert (2004). "Hugh Blaker: Doing His Bit for the Moderns". Journal of the History of Collections. 16 (2): 173–189. doi:10.1093/jhc/16.2.173. ISSN 0954-6650.
- Morley, Margaret (1978). Olivier: The Films and Faces of Laurence Olivier. Books for Pleasure. ISBN 0-7296-0099-8.
- Muir, John Kenneth (1999). A Critical History of Doctor Who on Television. Jefferson, North Carolina: McFarland & Company. ISBN 978-0-786-40442-1.
- Murphy, Robert (1989). Realism and Tinsel: Cinema and society in Britain 1939–1948. Routledge. ISBN 0-415-02982-1.
- Noble, Peter (1946). British Theatre. London: British Yearbooks. NLA 550647.
- Parker, John, ed. (1939). Who's Who in the Theatre (9th ed.). New York: Pitman Publishing Company.
- Parker, John, ed. (1947). Who's Who in the Theatre (10th ed.). London: Sir Isaac Pitman & Sons, Ltd.
- Parker, John, ed. (1972). Who's Who in the Theatre (15th ed.). London: Pitman Publishing. ISBN 0-273-31528-5.
- Quinlan, David (1984). British Sound Films: The Studio Years 1928–1959. B. T. Batsford. ISBN 0-7134-1874-5.
- Ramsden, John (1998). "Refocusing 'The People's War': British War Films of the 1950s". Journal of Contemporary History. 33 (1): 35–63. doi:10.1177/003200949803300103. ISSN 0022-0094. JSTOR 260996.
- Ross, Andrew (2015). Carry On Actors: The Complete Who's Who of the Carry On film series. Fantom Films. ISBN 978-1-781-96150-6.
- Ross, Robert (2011). Marty Feldman: The Biography of a Comedy Legend. Titan Books. ISBN 978-0-857-68378-6.
- Sharp, Robert (23 September 2004). "Hartnell, William Henry". In Matthew, H. C. G.; Harrison, Brian (eds.). Oxford Dictionary of National Biography. Vol. 25 (online ed.). Oxford University Press. pp. 628–629. doi:10.1093/ref:odnb/46471. ISBN 0-19-861375-X. (Subscription, Wikipedia Library access or UK public library membership required.)
- Sheratsky, Rodney E. (1975). Sloan, William (ed.). "Humphrey Jennings: Artist of the British Documentary". Film Library Quarterly. 8 (3/4): 6–39, 49–64.
- Sierz, Aleks (2021). Good Nights Out: A History of Popular British Theatre Since the Second World War. Methuen Drama. ISBN 978-1-350-20091-3.
- Symons, Mitchell (2012). Desert Island Discs: Flotsam & Jetsam. Bantam Press. ISBN 978-0-593-07007-9.
- Wearing, J. P. (2014). The London Stage 1950–1959: A Calendar of Productions, Performers, and Personnel (Second ed.). Rowman & Littlefield. ISBN 978-0-810-89308-5. LCCN 2014007763.
- Webber, Richard (2009). 50 Years of Carry On. Arrow Books. ISBN 978-0-099-49007-4.
- Youngkin, Stephen D. (2005). The Lost One: A Life of Peter Lorre. University Press of Kentucky. ISBN 978-0-813-12360-8. LCCN 2005009206.

=== Magazine and news sources ===
- "3,000 Wanted To Be Rose of Brighton Rock". Evening Argus. 28 February 1947. p. 4 – via Newspapers.com.
- "Actor Becomes Ill During Play". The Manchester Guardian. No. 25597. 8 August 1928. p. 9 – via Newspapers.com.
- "Actor's Seizure". Liverpool Daily Post. No. 22818. 8 August 1928. p. 8 – via Newspapers.com.
- "Actors Had to Do the Cooking". Manchester Evening News. No. 23203. 27 September 1943. p. 4 – via Newspapers.com.
- A. D. (13 March 1943). "Brighton Rock". The Manchester Guardian. No. 30094. p. 3 – via Newspapers.com.
- "Adam Faith as Billy Cotton's Guest Star". Dorset Evening Echo. No. 12577. 30 September 1961. p. 6 – via Newspapers.com.
- Aerial (26 September 1927). "Wireless Progress". Evening Despatch. No. 11322. p. 6 – via Newspapers.com.
- Agate, James (14 June 1944). "Myself at the Pictures". The Tatler and Bystander. Vol. 172, no. 2242. p. 4 – via Newspapers.com.
- Agate, James (30 October 1946). "At The Pictures: The Boletic Film". The Tatler and Bystander. Vol. 182, no. 2366. p. 132 – via Newspapers.com.
- Agate, James (2 April 1947). "At The Pictures: Old and New". The Tatler and Bystander. Vol. 184, no. 2386. p. 6 – via Newspapers.com.
- Aimes, Heward (7 July 1960). "Shows from the seaside". Leicester Evening Mail. No. 15446. p. 2 – via Newspapers.com.
- Ainsworth, John, ed. (21 October 2015). "100,000 BC and The Mutants (aka The Daleks)". Doctor Who: The Complete History. 1 (4). London: Panini Comics, Hachette Partworks. ISSN 2057-6048.
- Ainsworth, John, ed. (27 January 2016). "The Crusade, The Space Museum, The Chase and The Time Meddler". Doctor Who: The Complete History. 5 (11). London: Panini Comics, Hachette Partworks. ISSN 2057-6048.
- "Amateur Boxing". Esher News and Advertiser. No. 708. 2 December 1949. p. 4 – via Newspapers.com.
- "Amusements". Edmonton Bulletin. Vol. 48, no. 293. 14 December 1928. p. 18 – via Newspapers.com.
- "Amusements". Clacton Graphic. No. 2766. 18 August 1934. p. 8 – via British Newspaper Archive.
- Anstey, Edgar (16 June 1944). "The Cinema". The Spectator. Vol. 172, no. 6051. p. 547. ISSN 0038-6952. OCLC 1766325.
- Ariel (11 May 1931). "To-day's Best for Listeners". Daily Mirror. No. 8570. p. 18 – via Newspapers.com.
- "Around and about film studios". Marylebone Mercury. No. 5939. 8 September 1950. p. 2 – via Newspapers.com.
- "Around the Shows: An Entertainment Review". North Devon Journal Herald. Vol. 123, no. 6484. 12 July 1945. p. 8 – via Newspapers.com.
- "Around the Shows: An Entertainment Review". North Devon Journal Herald. Vol. 123, no. 6486. 26 July 1945. p. 8 – via Newspapers.com.
- "Arts Theatre". The Stage. No. 2564. 22 May 1930. p. 21 – via British Newspaper Archive.
- "Arts Theatre". The Stage. No. 2619. 9 October 1930. p. 15 – via British Newspaper Archive.
- "At the Cinemas". Barry and District News. Vol. 72, no. 3533. 16 October 1958. p. 2 – via Newspapers.com.
- "At the Theatre". Buckinghamshire Advertiser. Vol. 110, no. 5924. 9 April 1954. p. 13 – via Newspapers.com.
- Baily, Kenneth (18 August 1957). "Lib. is out on a limb". The Sunday People. No. 3950. p. 4 – via Newspapers.com.
- Barnes, Alan (March 2024). Quinn, Jason (ed.). "The Tell-Tale Hartnell". Doctor Who Magazine. No. 602. Panini Comics. pp. 44–47. ISSN 0957-9818.
- "Behind the Footlights". Croydon Times. No. 8177. 24 July 1939. p. 5 – via British Newspaper Archive.
- Bell, Jack (19 June 1957). "The TV 'Awkward Squad' Turns Out". Daily Mirror. No. 16645. p. 16 – via Newspapers.com.
- Bell, Jack (21 March 1958). "Dr. Patrick is on his way out!". Daily Mirror. No. 16879. p. 16 – via Newspapers.com.
- Bell, Jack (23 April 1966). "Oh, the agony of being Dr Who". Daily Mirror. No. 19387. p. 13 – via British Newspaper Archive.
- Bell, Jack (22 March 1967). "Dr Who turns rent collector". Daily Mirror. No. 19670. p. 16 – via British Newspaper Archive.
- Bell, Jack (27 April 1970). "Look—Who's Come Back." Daily Mirror. No. 20630. p. 16 – via British Newspaper Archive.
- Bendle, Alan (21 January 1950). "Guest stars will join Didsbury Rep". Manchester Evening News. No. 25160. p. 2 – via Newspapers.com.
- Betts, Ernest (11 June 1944). "Best film yet about the British footslogger". Sunday Express. p. 6 – via British Newspaper Archive.
- Betts, Ernest (21 September 1958). "Race-hate in a chain-gang". The People. No. 4007. p. 13 – via Newspapers.com.
- "Billy Hartnell, playing a lead in Lord Richard in the Pantry at Richmond Theatre". Daily Mirror. No. 9708. 9 January 1935. p. 9 – via Newspapers.com.
- "Birmingham". The Stage. No. 2893. 15 October 1936. p. 2 – via British Newspaper Archive.
- "Birmingham Entertainments". Birmingham Mail. No. 20531. 1 December 1931. p. 3 – via Newspapers.com.
- "Births". The Daily Telegraph and Morning Post. No. 31778. 15 June 1957. p. 12 – via Newspapers.com.
- "Births". The Daily Telegraph and Morning Post. No. 32318. 13 March 1959. p. 24 – via Newspapers.com.
- Bishop, George W. (13 November 1961). "Following a Tradition". The Daily Telegraph and Morning Post. No. 33147 – via Newspapers.com.
- Blackmore, Jean (23 March 1967). "A world watches history". Western Daily Press. p. 7 – via Newspapers.com.
- B. M. (21 April 1950). "Alexandra Theatre". Birmingham Weekly Post. No. 5622. p. 7 – via Newspapers.com.
- Bolter, Harold (20 May 1963). "Ordinary humble citizens of the world unite!". The Birmingham Post. No. 32626. p. 11 – via Newspapers.com.
- Brien, Alan (18 February 1956). "Magnani, the greatest actress of them all". The Guardian Journal. No. 40571. p. 4 – via Newspapers.com.
- "Brighton Theatre Royal". Evening Argus. 17 November 1931. p. 4 – via Newspapers.com.
- "British Film Stars In A Murder Mystery". Coventry Herald. No. 6602. 16 October 1936. p. 9 – via Newspapers.com.
- Brown, Ivor (10 April 1938). "The Week's Theatres". The Observer. No. 7663. p. 15 – via Newspapers.com.
- Bryson, Emrys (25 October 1961). "Third of the Whitehall's Long-Running Hits". The Guardian Journal. No. 42334. p. 4 – via Newspapers.com.
- "'Bullemore's' wife". Sussex Express and County Herald. No. 10379. 6 April 1962. p. 6 – via British Newspaper Archive.
- Burnup, Peter (17 March 1945). "The Agitator". Motion Picture Herald. Vol. 158, no. 11. pp. 2361–2362. ISSN 0027-1616. OCLC 7094766.
- C. (4 July 1939). "The Second Man: American Comedy at the Playhouse". Telegraph and Independent. p. 5 – via British Newspaper Archive.
- Calman, Montague (30 September 1950). "Montague Calman's Show Topics". The Whitstable Times and Tankerton Press. No. 4487. p. 2 – via Newspapers.com.
- Camden, Joan (11 March 1955). "British Studios Are Now Abustle With New Films". Shields Gazette. No. 31266. p. 7 – via British Newspaper Archive.
- Cane (5 March 1947). "Temptation Harbor (British-Made)". Variety. Vol. 165, no. 3. p. 22. ISSN 0042-2738.
- Cane (31 March 1948). "Escape (British)". Variety. Vol. 170, no. 4. p. 15. ISSN 0042-2738.
- Carney, Jessica (27 April 1995). "Much more than Who". The Stage. No. 5950. p. 13 – via British Newspaper Archive.
- "Carney—Hartnell". Esher News and Advertiser. No. 899. 21 October 1952. p. 3 – via Newspapers.com.
- "Carlton Cinema: Moulin Rouge and Bolero". Acton Gazette and Express. 28 September 1934. p. 4 – via Newspapers.com.
- Carter, Youngman (10 February 1954). "Sorrento's Golden Gulls' Eggs". The Tatler and Bystander. p. 215 – via Newspapers.com.
- C. C. (7 March 1936). "'Q' Theatre". Middlesex County Times. Vol. 73, no. 4595. p. 8 – via Newspapers.com.
- C. C. (28 January 1938). "'Q Theatre'". Acton Gazette and Express. p. 2 – via Newspapers.com.
- C. C. (20 January 1967). "Children Satisfied With Puss in Boots". Somerset County Gazette. p. 20 – via Newspapers.com.
- "Central Picture Theatre, Canterbury". The Whitstable Times and Tankerton Press. No. 3625. 20 January 1934. p. 10 – via Newspapers.com.
- "Chatter: London". Variety. Vol. 110, no. 5. 11 April 1933. pp. 52–53. ISSN 0042-2738.
- "Child Stars in Snappy Comedy". Fulham Chronicle. No. 3056. 1 November 1946. p. 8 – via Newspapers.com.
- "Chit Chat". The Stage. No. 3227. 4 February 1943. p. 4 – via British Newspaper Archive.
- "Cinema Programmes". Wells Journal. Vol. 96, no. 36. 6 September 1946. p. 3 – via Newspapers.com.
- "Cinemas". The Manchester Guardian. No. 31229. 11 November 1946. p. 1 – via Newspapers.com.
- "Clangers". Evening Argus. 7 October 1959. p. 3 – via Newspapers.com.
- Clem (28 June 1950). "Seagulls Over Sorrento". Variety. Vol. 178, no. 3. p. 60. ISSN 0042-2738.
- "Clever Comedy At Swansea Empire". South Wales Evening Post. No. 20759. 12 December 1939. p. 6 – via Newspapers.com.
- Coe, John (30 May 1968). "Superb Sonia Dresdel". Evening Post. No. 11147. p. 33 – via Newspapers.com.
- Collier, Lionel (10 February 1934). "On the Screens Now". Picturegoer. Vol. 3, no. 142. pp. 32, 34, 44 – via British Newspaper Archive.
- "Comedy in a sanatorium". Liverpool Daily Post. No. 31351. 15 February 1956. p. 5 – via Newspapers.com.
- "Comedy, Revue and Variety on Merseyside". Evening Express. No. 18918. 29 April 1932. p. 3 – via Newspapers.com.
- Comet (30 May 1947). "Star-dust". West London Chronicle. No. 2493. p. 2 – via British Newspaper Archive.
- "Comments by Press Agents Upon Coming Attractions". Evening Telegram. Vol. 53, no. 217. 5 January 1929. p. 30 – via Newspapers.com.
- "The Common Touch Family Again". Surrey Comet. No. 3035. 9 March 1955. p. 5 – via Newspapers.com.
- "Continuous Laughter in The Best People". Croydon Times. No. 5850. 4 May 1927. p. 5 – via British Newspaper Archive.
- Cook, Norman (20 June 1957). "'Youth Wants To Know' About Crimes And Their Punishment". Liverpool Echo. No. 24119. p. 8 – via Newspapers.com.
- Cook, Norman (14 August 1957). "Sick leave for the Sergeant-Major". Liverpool Echo. No. 24166. p. 8 – via Newspapers.com.
- Cookman, Anthony (5 July 1950). "At the Theatre". The Tatler and Bystander. Vol. 197, no. 2556. p. 12 – via Newspapers.com.
- Coster, Ian (20 November 1941). "Murder to Music". Evening Standard. No. 36570. p. 6 – via Newspapers.com.
- Coton, A. V. (18 June 1960). "High Aim in Documentary". The Daily Telegraph and Morning Post. No. 32711. p. 10 – via Newspapers.com.
- Cowan, Maurice (21 October 1945). "A Star Is Born". Sunday People. No. 3338. p. 6 – via Newspapers.com.
- Crawford, Iain (16 July 1959). "Sellers goes to war..." Evening Standard. No. 42017. p. 6 – via Newspapers.com.
- "Crime Does Pay". Scunthorpe Evening Telegraph. No. 18079. 23 December 1946. p. 3 – via Newspapers.com.
- "Crime of Passion". Dorset Evening Echo. No. 15207. 27 April 1970. p. 4 – via Newspapers.com.
- Crowther, Bosley (4 June 1945). "The Screen". The New York Times. Vol. 94, no. 31908. p. 22. Archived from the original on 19 April 2019.
- Crowther, Bosley (19 February 1951). "At the Bryant". The New York Times. Vol. 100, no. 33994. p. 19. Archived from the original on 19 August 2026.
- Crowther, Doreen (6 April 1996). "Too close to be convincing". Bolton Evening News. p. 15 – via Newspapers.com.
- C. S. (8 July 1960). "Last Night's Teleview". Evening Advertiser. No. 25350. p. 6 – via Newspapers.com.
- Daniels, John (17 June 1960). "A cross-channel trip for Lady B." The Birmingham Mail. No. 29388. p. 3 – via Newspapers.com.
- Darlington, William Aubrey (3 March 1932). "A Denunciation of War". The Daily Telegraph. No. 23959. p. 6 – via Newspapers.com.
- Darlington, William Aubrey (15 June 1950). "Ronald Shiner in Lively Part". The Daily Telegraph. No. 29628. p. 6 – via Newspapers.com.
- Davalle, Peter C. (17 September 1949). "'Perfect British Sergeant'". Western Mail. No. 25005. p. 4 – via Newspapers.com.
- Davis, Clifford (17 June 1960). "Whack-o! It's Max". Daily Mirror. No. 17574. p. 26 – via Newspapers.com.
- Davis, Clifford (6 August 1966). "Dr Who says: I am quitting". Daily Mirror. No. 19477. p. 1 – via Newspapers.com.
- D. C. K. (4 July 1950). "At the Theatres". South Wales Echo. No. 20740. p. 4 – via Newspapers.com.
- D. D-L. (10 February 1956). "New Role For 'Q'". Kensington Post. No. 6222. p. 2 – via Newspapers.com.
- Deans, Harris (16 February 1946). "Fascinating But Very, Very Wicked Lady". Belfast Telegraph. p. 2 – via Newspapers.com.
- "Death of the first Dr Who, aged 67". Western Daily Press. Vol. 234, no. 37900. 25 April 1975. p. 10 – via British Newspaper Archive.
- "Deaths". The Daily Telegraph. No. 37298. 25 April 1975. p. 32 – via Newspapers.com.
- Dent, Alan (8 March 1947). "The World of the Cinema: A Masterpiece". The Illustrated London News. Vol. 210, no. 5629. p. 244 – via Newspapers.com.
- Dent, Alan (31 January 1948). "The World of the Cinema: Semi-Successful". The Illustrated London News. Vol. 212, no. 5676. p. 138 – via Newspapers.com.
- Dent, Alan (2 March 1963). "The World of the Cinema: Facts or Fantasies". The Illustrated London News. Vol. 242, no. 6448. p. 318 – via Newspapers.com.
- Dent, Alan (8 June 1963). "The World of the Cinema: A Week of Aitches". The Illustrated London News. Vol. 242, no. 6462. p. 902 – via Newspapers.com.
- Denys (9 February 1950). "Northern Window". Evening Chronicle. No. 16377. p. 2 – via Newspapers.com.
- "Desperate Characters". Middlesex County Times and West Middlesex Gazette. No. 5151. 2 November 1946. p. 6 – via Newspapers.com.
- "Devonshire Park Theatre". Eastbourne Chronicle. No. 4386. 9 December 1939. p. 2 – via British Newspaper Archive.
- D. G. M. (12 September 1957). "Biggest laugh". Manchester Evening News. No. 27530. p. 2 – via Newspapers.com.
- D. H. (17 November 1961). "Perfectly Brittle". Bristol Evening Post. No. 9136. p. 3 – via Newspapers.com.
- Dixon, Campbell (6 April 1957). "Heroism Without Heroics". The Daily Telegraph and Morning Post. No. 31719. p. 9 – via Newspapers.com.
- Dixon, Campbell (12 June 1944). "This Is The Army". The Daily Telegraph and Morning Post. No. 27767. p. 3 – via Newspapers.com.
- Dixon, Campbell (22 October 1945). "Lincoln's Mantle Fell On This Man". The Daily Telegraph and Morning Post. No. 28189. p. 3 – via Newspapers.com.
- Dixon, Campbell (12 January 1948). "Babel in Bel Ami". The Daily Telegraph and Morning Post. No. 28876. p. 4 – via Newspapers.com.
- Dixon, Campbell (29 March 1948). "Mr. Wilcox's Best Film". The Daily Telegraph and Morning Post. No. 28941. p. 4 – via Newspapers.com.
- "Filmland". Bournemouth Daily Echo. No. 14854. 20 November 1948. p. 3 – via Newspapers.com.
- Dixon, Campbell (18 February 1956). "Young Love—English Fashion". The Daily Telegraph and Morning Post. No. 31368. p. 8 – via Newspapers.com.
- Dixon, Campbell (20 September 1958). "Getting the Taste for Guinness". The Daily Telegraph and Morning Post. No. 32171. p. 9 – via Newspapers.com.
- "Dr Who, the first Dalek fighter, dies". Daily Mirror. No. 22159. 25 April 1975. p. 10 – via British Newspaper Archive.
- "Duke of York's Theatre, Brighton". Evening Argus. 4 November 1933. p. 5 – via Newspapers.com.
- "East Grinstead". Surrey Mirror and County Post. No. 2925. 23 February 1934. p. 10 – via Newspapers.com.
- E. C. T. (20 June 1957). "Transit Camp's Lead-Swingers". The Daily Telegraph and Morning Post. No. 31782. p. 10 – via Newspapers.com.
- "Edinburgh". The Stage. No. 2639. 29 October 1931. p. 11 – via British Newspaper Archive.
- "Edinburgh". The Stage. No. 2695. 24 November 1932. p. 2 – via British Newspaper Archive.
- "Edinburgh". The Stage. No. 2899. 22 October 1936. p. 10 – via British Newspaper Archive.
- E. J. R. (22 January 1929). "The Theater". The Hamilton Spectator. Vol. 83, no. 18. p. 4 – via Newspapers.com.
- "Empire Coventry". The Coventry Standard and Warwickshire County Newspaper. No. 10681. 1 May 1948. p. 3 – via Newspapers.com.
- "End the chases!". Birmingham Gazette. No. 33324. 12 March 1951. p. 4 – via Newspapers.com.
- "Entertainments". South Wales Argus. No. 16578. 17 November 1945. p. 2 – via Newspapers.com.
- "Escort for the Yangtse man". Evening Argus. 31 July 1957. p. 8 – via Newspapers.com.
- Evans, Simon (9 March 1996). "Grandad to a generation". The Birmingham Post. No. 42521. p. 37. ISSN 0963-7915 – via Newspapers.com.
- E. W. B. (20 December 1923). "Plays & Players". The Westminster Gazette. No. 9498. p. 7 – via British Newspaper Archive.
- E. W. B. (28 June 1933). "Follow the Lady". The Era. Vol. 96, no. 4943. p. 20 – via British Newspaper Archive.
- "Expert Advice". Surrey Comet. No. 7963. 2 January 1954. p. 9 – via Newspapers.com.
- "Faithfully Yours". The Stage. No. 3061. 30 November 1939. p. 12 – via British Newspaper Archive.
- "Family Affairs at the Victoria Palace". The Marylebone Record. No. 1146. 16 May 1936. p. 7 – via British Newspaper Archive.
- Fenton, Lynn (23 March 1963). "Fine film, but not a trail-blazer". The Journal. No. 36338. p. 7 – via Newspapers.com.
- "Film of the Secret Service". Sunday Sun. No. 1353. 1 July 1945. p. 4 – via Newspapers.com.
- "Film Star at Molesey Tournament". Surrey Comet. No. 7575. 15 March 1950. p. 3 – via Newspapers.com.
- "Film Star Carole Waits at the Gate". Evening Argus. 15 July 1947. p. 3 – via Newspapers.com.
- Fleet, Patrick (3 March 1956). "Army Rackets Make First-Rate Comedy". Bristol Evening Post. No. 7405. p. 2 – via Newspapers.com.
- Fleet, Patrick (24 August 1957). "Leave Your Scruples at Home to Enjoy This". Bristol Evening Post. No. 7863. p. 2 – via Newspapers.com.
- "Football Pool Comedy". The Stage. No. 3856. 10 March 1955. p. 10 – via British Newspaper Archive.
- "Footlights and Pictures". Nottingham Evening Post. No. 15978. 13 September 1929. p. 6 – via Newspapers.com.
- Forth, Peter (21 May 1963). "Sir Brian goes into action". Western Daily Press. Vol. 210, no. 34586. p. 7 – via Newspapers.com.
- "Forum New Street". Evening Despatch. No. 17281. 7 December 1946. p. 4 – via Newspapers.com.
- F. P. (June 1933). Harris, Percy W. (ed.). "I'm an Explosive!". Home Movies and Home Talkies. Vol. 2, no. 1. p. 13.
- F. R. G. (1 December 1931). "Birmingham Amateurs in Miss Hook of Holland". Evening Despatch. p. 9 – via Newspapers.com.
- "From the stage". Marylebone Mercury. No. 6038. 1 August 1952. p. 2 – via Newspapers.com.
- Fullford, Jack (5 May 1960). "Crying Need for Good Writers in Film Industry". Dorset Echo. No. 12089. p. 7 – via Newspapers.com.
- G. A. A. (22 March 1933). "New Comedian Discovered in I'm an Explosive!". The Era. Vol. 96, no. 4929. p. 5 – via British Newspaper Archive.
- Gander, L Marsland (15 May 1951). "Publicity v. Entertainment". The Daily Telegraph. No. 29911. p. 6 – via Newspapers.com.
- "Gems of the Variety Stage". Evening Despatch. No. 12445. 11 May 1931. p. 2 – via British Newspaper Archive.
- "General Release says about Current Films". Reveille. No. 398. 23 February 1951. p. 4 – via Newspapers.com.
- "Ghost Train Staged at Repertory Theatre". Courier and Advertiser. No. 37235. 17 September 1940. p. 5 – via British Newspaper Archive.
- Gibbs, Patrick (24 October 1949). "Comedy Set in Seamen's Mess". The Daily Telegraph. No. 29430. p. 7 – via Newspapers.com.
- Gibbs, Patrick (11 April 1950). "At Government House". The Daily Telegraph. No. 29572. p. 6 – via Newspapers.com.
- Gibbs, Patrick (1 November 1963). "Hostesses with the Leastest". The Daily Telegraph. No. 33757. p. 11 – via Newspapers.com.
- Gillatt, Gary (24 August 2011). Spilsbury, Tom (ed.). "The Gunfighters & The Awakening". Doctor Who Magazine. No. 437. Panini Comics. pp. 67–69. ISSN 0957-9818.
- "Glasgow". The Stage. No. 2640. 5 November 1931. p. 8 – via British Newspaper Archive.
- Gold, Richard (14 September 1960). "Piccadilly Third Stop (British)". Variety. Vol. 220, no. 3. p. 18. ISSN 0042-2738.
- Gold, Richard (29 November 1961). "The Cupboard". Variety. Vol. 225, no. 1. p. 66. ISSN 0042-2738.
- Gold, Richard (13 November 1963). "The World 10 Times Over (British)". Variety. Vol. 232, no. 12. p. 6. ISSN 0042-2738.
- Goodlad, Douglas (30 June 1945). "Next Week At Leicester Cinemas And Theatres". Illustrated Leicester Chronicle. No. 1074. p. 9 – via Newspapers.com.
- "Gordon M'Leod Did Not Play". Brantford Expositor. 25 January 1929. p. 2 – via Newspapers.com.
- Gordon, Roy (23 May 1950). "Fine performance by Barbara Stanwyck". Evening Despatch. No. 18352. p. 4 – via Newspapers.com.
- Gough, John (18 March 1960). "Recognition". TVTimes. Vol. 18, no. 229. p. 5 – via British Newspaper Archive.
- "Grand Opera House: What Anne Brought Home". The Harrogate Advertiser. 6 July 1940. p. 9 – via British Newspaper Archive.
- "Grand Theatre, Fulham". The Fulham Chronicle. No. 2006. 17 September 1926. p. 8 – via Newspapers.com.
- Grant, Elspeth (31 August 1955). "At the Pictures: This Western Rings True". The Tatler and Bystander. pp. 362–363 – via Newspapers.com.
- Grant, Elspeth (24 April 1957). "At the Pictures: Cruising Down the Chinese River". The Tatler and Bystander. pp. 212–213 – via Newspapers.com.
- Grant, Elspeth (1 October 1958). "Convicts in colour clash". The Tatler and Bystander. p. 33 – via Newspapers.com.
- Grant, Elspeth (20 February 1963). "Gruesome & idyllic". The Tatler and Bystander. p. 383 – via Newspapers.com.
- "Great Open Spaces And Real Adventure". North London Press. No. 4206. 1 November 1946. p. 5 – via British Newspaper Archive.
- Grein, J. T. (6 August 1924). "Criticisms in Cameo". The Sketch. Vol. 127, no. 1645. p. 274 – via Newspapers.com.
- Grein, J. T. (28 May 1930). "Criticisms in Cameo". The Sketch. Vol. 150, no. 1948. p. 442 – via Newspapers.com.
- Griffiths, David (10 June 1960). "A Place of My Own". TVTimes. Vol. 19, no. 241. p. 16 – via British Newspaper Archive.
- G. W. B. (21 May 1930). "The Ugly Duchess". The Era. Vol. 93, no. 4781. p. 1 – via British Newspaper Archive.
- G. W. J. (10 April 1928). "A Wodehouse Comedy". Liverpool Echo. No. 15063. p. 3 – via Newspapers.com.
- "Happy Occasion". Esher News and Advertiser. No. 834. 2 May 1952. p. 2 – via Newspapers.com.
- "The hard-voiced flint-hearted sergeant-major of The Army Game TV series becomes proud grandfather". Bristol Evening Post. No. 7912. 21 October 1957. p. 4 – via Newspapers.com.
- Harman, Jympson (21 June 1952). "Bernard Braden Moves Into Movies". The Evening News. No. 21947. p. 4 – via British Newspaper Archive.
- Harman, Jympson (6 April 1957). "All In The Swim Now..." Liverpool Echo. No. 24056. p. 3 – via Newspapers.com.
- "Hartnell Exits Cast Of London Wilde Revival". Variety. Vol. 252, no. 7. 2 October 1968. ISSN 0042-2738.
- "Hartnell steps down". Evening Standard. No. 44862. 17 September 1968. p. 44 – via Newspapers.com.
- Harvey, Brian (4 November 1949). "A Play About the Amethyst". Birmingham Gazette. No. 32907. p. 4 – via Newspapers.com.
- Harvey, Brian (14 April 1950). "A Film About the Army and a Play About the Navy..." Birmingham Gazette. No. 33042. p. 4 – via Newspapers.com.
- Hastings, Ronald (24 August 1968). "A Glut of New Plays". The Daily Telegraph and Morning Post. No. 35249. p. 24 – via Newspapers.com.
- "Headline". Kinematograph Weekly. Vol. 321, no. 1909. 18 November 1943. p. 41 – via British Newspaper Archive.
- Hearn, Marcus, ed. (February 2021). Doctor Who: Chronicles 1965. Panini Magazines. ISBN 978-1-846-53307-5.
  - McGown, Alistair. "The Diary of Doctor Who". In Hearn (2021), pp. 12–19.
  - Rigby, Jonathan. "Maureen O'Brien". In Hearn (2021), pp. 28–29.
- Hearn, Marcus, ed. (November 2022). "The Road to An Unearthly Child". Doctor Who: A BBC Production (Doctor Who Magazine supplement). No. 583. Panini Magazines. pp. 4–5. ISSN 0957-9818.
- "Hearts of Gold". Eastern Daily Press. No. 26516. 21 February 1956. p. 4 – via Newspapers.com.
- Heet, Patrick (17 March 1951). "Manhunt Finale in British Outdoor Thriller". Bristol Evening Post. No. 5866. p. 2 – via Newspapers.com.
- "Her First Play: Glasgow-Born Author". The Scotsman. No. 34977. 5 July 1955. p. 11 – via British Newspaper Archive.
- "The Hippodrome". Gloucester Journal. Vol. 212, no. 11011. 7 October 1933. p. 15 – via Newspapers.com.
- Hobman, Molly (8 April 1957). "Godot message again, and it's like a damp squid". Evening Advertiser. No. 24343. p. 4 – via Newspapers.com.
- Holbrook, Norman (18 April 1950). "Brisk, lively fun at the Alexandra". Evening Despatch. No. 18322. p. 4 – via Newspapers.com.
- "Hollywood Finds an Original Plot". Coventry Evening Telegraph. No. 19207. 27 January 1953. p. 4 – via Newspapers.com.
- "Honest Truth About the Incredible Dr Who". Sunday Post. No. 3156. 20 February 1966. p. 9 – via British Newspaper Archive.
- Hope-Wallace, Philip (15 February 1956). "Wing for Catty: Sanatorium Setting for New Play". Manchester Guardian. No. 34100. p. 5 – via Newspapers.com.
- Hornby, William (15 March 1958). "Last Night". Evening Chronicle. No. 18887. p. 11 – via Newspapers.com.
- H. T. H. (24 November 1958). "This cut out the light touch". Manchester Evening News. No. 27902. p. 2 – via Newspapers.com.
- Hughes, Herbert (19 September 1931). "Gramophone Notes". The Daily Telegraph. No. 23819. p. 5 – via Newspapers.com.
- "Husband Stars in Wife's New Play". Surrey Comet. No. 3084. 5 March 1955. p. 7 – via Newspapers.com.
- H. W. R. (25 April 1950). "To Entertain You". Liverpool Echo. No. 21900. p. 4 – via Newspapers.com.
- H. W. R. (26 August 1955). "And On The Stage". Liverpool Echo. No. 23556. p. 4 – via Newspapers.com.
- I. E. G. (11 December 1928). "Amusements". Calgary Daily Herald. No. 5464. p. 16 – via Newspapers.com.
- "In the Provinces". The Stage. No. 3821. 8 July 1954. p. 13 – via British Newspaper Archive.
- "The Iron Woman: May Chevalier Returns". The Civil and Military Gazette. Vol. 52, no. 2417. Lahore. 26 March 1932. p. 2 – via British Newspaper Archive.
- Isaac, Fred (7 February 1950). "Hip, Hooray for Variety". Evening Chronicle. No. 16375. p. 4 – via Newspapers.com.
- "Items". The Stage. No. 2499. 21 February 1929. p. 15 – via British Newspaper Archive.
- "It's Murder Sarge". Evening Argus. 27 August 1959. p. 10 – via Newspapers.com.
- Jay, Ivor (13 January 1953). "Gentler crime in The Ringer's day". Evening Despatch. No. 19173. p. 4 – via Newspapers.com.
- J. C. T. (16 February 1956). "Ring for Catty at the Lyric". Birmingham Post. No. 30416 – via Newspapers.com.
- J. D. W. (8 July 1960). "A fair mixture". Manchester Evening News. No. 28404. p. 2 – via British Newspaper Archive.
- "Jean Simmons to Visit America". Huddersfield Daily Examiner. No. 27198. 23 September 1950. p. 2 – via Newspapers.com.
- J. E. H. B. (28 September 1926). "Norwich Amusements". Eastern Daily Press. No. 17403. p. 6 – via Newspapers.com.
- J. E. H. B. (15 October 1929). "Theatre Royal". Eastern Daily Press. No. 18119. p. 10 – via Newspapers.com.
- J. K. (21 January 1953). "The Ringer is worthwhile detective film". Surrey Comet. No. 7864. p. 5 – via Newspapers.com.
- J. M. J. (25 April 1936). "The Ghost Train at the Victoria Palace". The Marylebone Record. No. 1143. p. 8 – via British Newspaper Archive.
- Jones, Gwyn (25 April 1950). "'Men Only'". Liverpool Evening Express. No. 24517. p. 3 – via Newspapers.com.
- Jones, Paul (21 October 1961). "County Commentary". West Cumberland Times. Vol. 87, no. 8570. p. 15 – via Newspapers.com.
- J. S. (3 March 1932). "The Man I Killed: M. Maurice Rostand's Anti-War Play". The Manchester Guardian. No. 26673. p. 8 – via Newspapers.com.
- Keay, Douglas (26 July 1957). "Off Parade–At the Hartnell Home". TV Times. Vol. 8, no. 91. p. 29. ISSN 0962-1660.
- Kirwan, Patrick (25 October 1946). "The first faithful film of London's underworld". Evening Standard. No. 38096. p. 8 – via Newspapers.com.
- K. L. G. (16 August 1933). "The Lure". The Era. Vol. 96, no. 4950. p. 15 – via British Newspaper Archive.
- Koval, Francis (18 February 1956). "War Office Wouldn't Lift A Finger To Help Them!". Huddersfield Daily Examiner. No. 29155. p. 4 – via Newspapers.com.
- Koval, Francis (6 April 1957). "Francis Koval Looks At The New Pictures". Huddersfield Daily Examiner. No. 29565. p. 5 – via Newspapers.com.
- Koval, Francis (2 November 1963). "Francis Koval reports on the week's new pictures". Huddersfield Daily Examiner. No. 31941. p. 5 – via Newspapers.com.
- "Lady Yule to Seek Market in U.S.". Motion Picture Herald. Vol. 158, no. 13. 31 March 1945. p. 40. ISSN 0027-1616. OCLC 7094766.
- Landen, Richard (December 1983). McKenzie, Alan (ed.). "Heather Hartnell". Doctor Who Monthly. No. 83. pp. 16–19. ISSN 0957-9818.
- "The Late Christopher Bean at the Victoria Palace". The Marylebone Record. No. 1145. 9 May 1936. p. 3 – via British Newspaper Archive.
- "Learned Part in 48 Hours". The Star. No. 16433. 3 July 1939. p. 7 – via British Newspaper Archive.
- Leigh, Vanora (12 May 2001). "Letters from a madman". Evening Argus Weekend. p. 10 – via Newspapers.com.
- Lejeune, C. A. (28 June 1944). "Cinema Cameos". The Sketch. Vol. 200, no. 2603. p. 10 – via Newspapers.com.
- Lejeune, C. A. (23 March 1947). "Down At The Docks". The Observer. No. 8130. p. 2 – via Newspapers.com.
- Lejeune, C. A. (2 April 1947). "Reviews in Brief". The Sketch. p. 165 – via Newspapers.com.
- Lejeune, C. A. (21 January 1948). "Brighton Rock". The Sketch. p. 39 – via Newspapers.com.
- Lejeune, C. A. (28 March 1948). "At the Films: Twenty-First". The Observer. No. 8183. p. 2 – via Newspapers.com.
- Lejeune, C. A. (28 August 1949). "Misunderstanding". The Observer. No. 8256. p. 6 – via Newspapers.com.
- Lejeune, C. A. (14 September 1949). "Films in Brief". The Sketch. p. 246 – via Newspapers.com.
- Lejeune, C. A. (7 April 1957). "Agony Column". The Observer. No. 8649. p. 15 – via Newspapers.com.
- Lewis, Bryan (3 November 1960). "'CSM Bullimore' Back After Two Years of Varied Film Parts". Nottingham Evening News. No. 23342. p. 10 – via Newspapers.com.
- Lewis, Bryan (25 April 1964). "Bill Hartnell reconciled to his 'demob' job as Dr. Who". Evening Advertiser. No. 26527. p. 4 – via Newspapers.com.
- Litherland, Roy (26 September 1959). "Brian Rix beats a Blackpool drum—it's a real rib-tickler". Bolton Evening News. No. 28582. p. 5 – via Newspapers.com.
- L. J. H. (26 May 1945). "That Extra Something". Picturegoer. p. 8 – via British Newspaper Archive.
- L. L. (11 November 1955). "Harry Green in Human Story". The Daily Telegraph and Morning Post. No. 31285. p. 9 – via Newspapers.com.
- "Local Amusements". Rochdale Observer. No. 7730. 27 June 1945. p. 1 – via Newspapers.com.
- "Local Jottings". Nottingham Evening Post. No. 21327. 3 December 1946. p. 4 – via Newspapers.com.
- "Local Programmes for the Week". North Wilts Herald and Advertiser. No. 4480. 6 June 1947. p. 7 – via Newspapers.com.
- "Local 'Talkie' Attractions". The News and Advertiser. No. 34. 7 December 1934. p. 8 – via British Newspaper Archive.
- "London Theatres". The Stage. No. 2605. 5 March 1931. pp. 16–17 – via British Newspaper Archive.
- Lowe, Joshua (12 May 1943). "The Bells Go Down (British-Made)". Variety. Vol. 150, no. 9. p. 8. ISSN 0042-2738.
- "Lyceum Cinema, Antrim Road". Belfast News-Letter. 6 April 1937. p. 11 – via British Newspaper Archive.
- Mace, Edward (5 May 1968). "Briefing". The Observer – via Newspapers.com.
- "The Man I Killed: Tense Drama of Maurice Rostand's Play". Nottingham Journal. No. 33140. 3 March 1932. p. 5 – via British Newspaper Archive.
- "Man in the Hitchcock Mould Produces a Winner". Alcester Chronicle. No. 5013. 9 December 1960. p. 11 – via Newspapers.com.
- Mann, Roderick (29 July 1949). "Frances Day finds something new". Birmingham Gazette. No. 32823. p. 4 – via Newspapers.com.
- Mannock, P. L. (10 June 1944). "P. L. Mannock reviews the new films". Daily Herald. No. 8830 – via Newspapers.com.
- Mannock, P. L. (25 October 1946). "Lamarr—manhunter!". Daily Herald. No. 9563. p. 2 – via Newspapers.com.
- Mannock, P. L. (9 January 1948). "Thank you, Disney". Daily Herald. No. 9938. p. 2 – via Newspapers.com.
- Mannock, P. L. (15 June 1950). "Naval hit is launched". Daily Herald. No. 10692. p. 3 – via Newspapers.com.
- Manvell, Roger (January 1945). "Recent FIlms". Britain To-Day. No. 105. pp. 35–36.
- Marson, Richard (April 1987). Cranna, Sheila (ed.). "Why being a Doctor Who Girl wasn't a dream come true...". Doctor Who Magazine. No. 123. pp. 6–10. ISSN 0957-9818.
- Matthews, H. G. (August 1950). Stephens, Frances (ed.). "Seagulls over Sorrento". Theatre World. Vol. 46, no. 307. pp. 6, 8.
- M. C. (3 February 1960). "Best 'travelogue' that ever was..." Surrey Comet. No. 8565. p. 3 – via Newspapers.com.
- McFadden, Don (29 April 1950). "Bill Hartnell's Unhappy". Picturegoer. Vol. 19, no. 782. p. 9 – via British Newspaper Archive.
- McKinty, James (28 May 1949). "U.S. Ambassador's Wife Will Present 'Oscars' in London". Western Mail. No. 24909. p. 4 – via Newspapers.com.
- M. D. (2 October 1930). "George Moore's Play". The Daily Telegraph. No. 23520. p. 8 – via Newspapers.com.
- Melling, John Kennedy (12 January 1967). "Panto on a Cinema Tour". The Stage and Television Today. No. 4474. p. 14 – via British Newspaper Archive.
- Melvin, Edwin F. (1 October 1945). "David Niven at Exeter In War Film From England". The Christian Science Monitor. Vol. 37, no. 260. p. 4.
- "Metagama Brought Artists". The Gazette. Vol. 157, no. 217. 10 September 1928. p. 21 – via Newspapers.com.
- Meyler, Guy (22 January 1966). "Journey into space with ten million fans". Manchester Evening News. No. 178. p. 3 – via Newspapers.com.
- M. G. (3 March 1932). "The Man I Killed is a Moving Play". Evening News. No. 15652. p. 3 – via British Newspaper Archive.
- "Mistaken Managements". The Daily Telegraph. No. 30751. 28 January 1954. p. 6 – via Newspapers.com.
- M. N. (15 August 1957). "Tigress, too". Manchester Evening News. No. 27506. p. 2 – via Newspapers.com.
- "Movies". Newsweek. Vol. 25, no. 22. 28 May 1945. pp. 112–115. ISSN 0028-9604. OCLC 818916146.
- "Mr. Carney Keeps Up Family Tradition". Kent and Sussex Courier. No. 6693. 3 April 1964. p. 9 – via Newspapers.com.
- "Mr Ladd's small son steals the show". Liverpool Daily Post. No. 32157. 20 September 1958. p. 5 – via Newspapers.com.
- "Mr. Manchester's Diary". Manchester Evening News. No. 25170. 2 February 1950. p. 3 – via Newspapers.com.
- "Mr. William Hartnell – Well-Known Film Star Resides at Thames Ditton". Esher News and Advertiser. 11 June 1948. p. 3 – via Newspapers.com.
- Myers, Harold (31 January 1951). "The Dark Man (British)". Variety. Vol. 181, no. 8. p. 6. ISSN 0042-2738.
- Myers, Harold (26 November 1952). "The Pickwick Papers (British)". Variety. Vol. 188, no. 12. pp. 6, 18. ISSN 0042-2738.
- Myers, Harold (10 April 1957). "Yangtse Incident (British)". Variety. Vol. 206, no. 6. p. 6. ISSN 0042-2738.
- "Nap Hand: Ralph Lynn Farce is Full of Laughs". Norwood News. No. 3874. 12 April 1940. p. 6 – via Newspapers.com.
- Nathan, David (16 November 1961). "Somefing nasty in the cupboard". Daily Herald. No. 14214. p. 6 – via Newspapers.com.
- Nazarro, Joe (February 1989). Freeman, John (ed.). "Interview: Terry Nation". Doctor Who Magazine. No. 145. pp. 17–21. ISSN 0957-9818.
- "New Army Comedy Series from Granada". The Stage. No. 3973. 6 June 1957. p. 7 – via British Newspaper Archive.
- "New Panto Managements". The Stage. No. 4471. 21 December 1966. p. 4 – via British Newspaper Archive.
- "New Royal, Pontypool". The Free Press of Monmouthshire. Vol. 74, no. 3934. 9 February 1934. p. 3 – via Newspapers.com.
- "New Stage Departure". Richmond Herald. No. 2652. 4 April 1936. p. 28 – via British Newspaper Archive.
- "Next Week's Features on Stage and Screen". Richmond Herald. No. 3155. 1 December 1945. p. 5 – via British Newspaper Archive.
- "Next Week's Features on Stage and Screen". Richmond Herald. No. 3156. 8 December 1945. p. 7 – via British Newspaper Archive.
- "Next Week's Films". Surrey Mirror and County Post. No. 3584. 18 October 1946. p. 3 – via Newspapers.com.
- "No Hiding Place". TVTimes. No. 594. 18 March 1967. p. 37 – via British Newspaper Archive.
- North, Max (21 June 1957). "Even the Sergeant-Major is Happy!". Manchester Evening News. No. 27459. p. 2 – via Newspapers.com.
- North, Max (23 August 1957). "Whodunit? It Seems We All Do These Days". Manchester Evening News. No. 27513. p. 2 – via Newspapers.com.
- "Not So Green: New Detective Farce". The Era. Vol. 95, no. 4882. 27 April 1932. p. 25 – via British Newspaper Archive.
- "Now Back to Shakespeare?". Somerset County Gazette. 20 January 1967. p. 21 – via Newspapers.com.
- "Now Davy Jones Has a Clock Racket". Nottingham Evening News. No. 22530. 25 March 1958. p. 7 – via Newspapers.com.
- Oakes, Philip (6 April 1957). "Anita Ekberg's Pneumatic Drill". The Guardian Journal. No. 40922. p. 4 – via Newspapers.com.
- "Obituary: Mr William Hartnell". Kent and Sussex Courier. No. 7271. 2 May 1975. p. 10 – via Newspapers.com.
- O'Brien, Steve (5 April 1947). "New film to feature Liverpool". Evening Express. No. 23570. p. 2 – via Newspapers.com.
- O'Brien, Steve (26 June 1948). "George prefers England to Hollywood". Evening Express. No. 23951. p. 3 – via Newspapers.com.
- "Odeon Has British Film". Somerset County Herald. No. 5029. 24 May 1947. p. 4 – via Newspapers.com.
- "On your screens tonight". North-Western Evening Mail. No. 17951. 21 March 1958. p. 2 – via Newspapers.com.
- "One Hundred Years Wise". Manchester Evening News. 23 April 1929. p. 3 – via Newspapers.com.
- "Opera, Comedy, Revue and Variety on Merseyside". Evening Express. No. 18162. 19 November 1929. p. 8 – via Newspapers.com.
- Otta (5 April 1967). "No Hiding Place ('The Game')". Variety. Vol. 246, no. 7. p. 52. ISSN 0042-2738.
- Passingham, Kenneth (28 September 1958). "So Glynis breaks it up". Sunday Dispatch. p. 2 – via Newspapers.com.
- Pearce, Emery (2 April 1957). "Soft-pedal heroes in great film". Daily Herald. No. 12779. p. 5 – via Newspapers.com.
- Pearson, James (22 April 1932). "Basil Foster 'Carries His Bat On the Stage'". Evening Despatch. No. 12741. p. 6 – via Newspapers.com.
- Pearson, James (9 October 1936). "Every Girl's 'Dream-Partner'—But He's Too Embarrassed To Dance with Them!". Evening Despatch. No. 14128. p. 6 – via Newspapers.com.
- "Period Drama Well Presented at Regina". The Leader. Vol. 25, no. 252. 26 October 1928. p. 13 – via Newspapers.com.
- "Personal Triumph for City Rep. Player". The Star. No. 16434. 4 July 1939. p. 3 – via British Newspaper Archive.
- "The Picture Houses". The Walsall Observer and South Staffordshire Chronicle. No. 3583. 26 June 1937. p. 2 – via Newspapers.com.
- Pixley, Andrew (14 August 2014). Spilsbury, Tom (ed.). "An Adventure in Space and Time". Doctor Who Magazine. No. Special Edition 38: The Year of the Doctor. Panini Magazines. pp. 60–79. ISSN 0963-1275.
- Plain, Penny (23 November 1946). "Entertainment Review". The Surrey Advertiser. No. 10626. p. 3 – via Newspapers.com.
- Plain, Penny (7 March 1951). "Entertainment Review". The Surrey Advertiser. No. 11031. p. 3 – via Newspapers.com.
- "Plays and Players". Walsall Observer. No. 3254. 7 March 1931. p. 3 – via Newspapers.com.
- Priestley, Mike (2 March 1996). "Doctor who had a hidden secret". Telegraph & Argus. p. 5A – via Newspapers.com.
- "The Provinces". The Stage. No. 2394. 17 February 1927. pp. 6, 8 – via British Newspaper Archive.
- "The Provinces". The Stage. No. 2424. 15 September 1927. pp. 6, 8 – via British Newspaper Archive.
- "The Provinces". The Stage. No. 2473. 23 August 1928. pp. 6, 8 – via British Newspaper Archive.
- "The Provinces". The Stage. No. 2507. 18 April 1929. pp. 5, 22–23 – via British Newspaper Archive.
- "The Provinces". The Stage. No. 2510. 9 May 1929. pp. 3, 5–6 – via British Newspaper Archive.
- "The Provinces". The Stage. No. 2536. 7 November 1929. pp. 25–26 – via British Newspaper Archive.
- "The Provinces". The Stage. No. 2539. 28 November 1929. pp. 25–26 – via British Newspaper Archive.
- "Provinces". The Stage. No. 3063. 14 December 1939. p. 13 – via British Newspaper Archive.
- "Provincial Production". The Stage. No. 2665. 28 April 1932. p. 5 – via British Newspaper Archive.
- Purser, Philip (18 June 1960). "Dreams vanish one by one". News Chronicle. No. 35545. p. 3 – via British Newspaper Archive.
- "The 'Q'". The Stage. No. 3375. 6 December 1945. p. 4 – via British Newspaper Archive.
- "'Q' Theatre". Middlesex County Times and West Middlesex Gazette. No. 5103. 1 December 1945. p. 3 – via Newspapers.com.
- "Queen's Cinema". Formby Times. No. 2821. 14 July 1945. p. 2 – via Newspapers.com.
- The Rambler (16 October 1934). "Plays at Richmond". Daily Mirror. No. 9637. p. 11 – via Newspapers.com.
- Rau, Neil (27 April 1946). "Tribute Paid Foot Soldier". Los Angeles Examiner. Vol. 43, no. 137. p. 9 – via Newspapers.com.
- R. A. W. (17 June 1960). "A real, tough villain from Wales". Southern Evening Echo. No. 21969. p. 3 – via Newspapers.com.
- Raymond, Moore (20 September 1953). "Danger!—In TV Censorship". Sunday Dispatch. No. 7924. p. 8 – via Newspapers.com.
- R. B. M. (6 February 1935). "Swinging the Lead". The Era. Vol. 98, no. 5027. p. 17 – via British Newspaper Archive.
- R. B. M. (23 September 1936). "Nothing Like Publicity". The Era. Vol. 100, no. 5112. p. 22 – via British Newspaper Archive.
- "Recalled Good Days of Drama in Saint John". The Evening Times-Globe. Vol. 71, no. 25. 30 January 1929. p. 2 – via Newspapers.com.
- "Records of the Month". Sound Wave: The Gramophone Journal. Vol. 25, no. 9. September 1931. pp. 406–415 – via British Newspaper Archive.
- "Regal Kingston". Surrey Comet. 7 May 1947. p. 8 – via Newspapers.com.
- "Regal Popular". Derby Evening Telegraph. Vol. 121, no. 20755. 27 March 1948. p. 2 – via Newspapers.com.
- "The Regent Pictures". The Bridge of Allan Gazette. Vol. 61, no. 6. 29 March 1947. p. 5 – via Newspapers.com.
- "Rep. Players in Famous Comedy-Thriller". Evening Telegraph. No. 19908. 14 September 1940. p. 3 – via British Newspaper Archive.
- "Richard Greene and A B 17 Star in Flying Fortress". Jacksonville Journal. Vol. 57, no. 58. 19 November 1943. p. 16 – via Newspapers.com.
- Richards, Dick (11 January 1948). "Please, No More of This!". Sunday Pictorial. No. 1713. p. 9 – via Newspapers.com.
- Richards, Dick (11 December 1949). "Wilcox plans Biggest Film: The 'Old Vic' Story". Sunday Pictorial. No. 1812. p. 11 – via Newspapers.com.
- Richards, Dick (28 May 1950). "Praise These Daring Men!". Sunday Pictorial. No. 1836. p. 11 – via Newspapers.com.
- Richards, Dick (4 June 1950). "Film 'Find' Pays Off". Sunday Pictorial. No. 1837. p. 13 – via Newspapers.com.
- Richards, Dick (18 March 1951). "The Bright Lights". Sunday Pictorial. No. 1878. p. 11 – via Newspapers.com.
- Richards, Jeffrey (25 February 1996). "Gone but not exterminated". The Sunday Telegraph. No. 1811. p. 40 – via Newspapers.com.
- "Richmond Theatre". Richmond Herald. No. 2566. 3 November 1934. p. 9 – via British Newspaper Archive.
- "Richmond Theatre". Richmond Herald. No. 2568. 20 October 1934. p. 9 – via British Newspaper Archive.
- "Richmond Theatre". Richmond Herald. No. 2570. 17 November 1934. p. 9 – via British Newspaper Archive.
- "Richmond Theatre". Acton Gazette. 2 April 1937. p. 3 – via Newspapers.com.
- "Richmond's Repertory Company". Richmond Herald. No. 2578. 12 January 1935. p. 10 – via British Newspaper Archive.
- Rigby, Jonathan (June 2023). "William Hartnell". In Hearn, Marcus (ed.). Doctor Who: Chronicles 1963–64. Panini Magazines. pp. 22–27. ISBN 978-1-804-91126-6.
- R. K. P. (22 November 1946). "Notes on the Show". The Slough Observer. No. 3333. p. 11 – via Newspapers.com.
- Roden, Raymond (22 April 1950). "International Week". Sutton Coldfield News. No. 2574. p. 6 – via Newspapers.com.
- Rodford, Peter (14 May 1968). "How Dr Who found space for a hit". Western Daily Press. Vol. 220, no. 35751. p. 6 – via Newspapers.com.
- "Role That Made the World Weep". Hinckley Times & Guardian. No. 2360. 11 May 1934. p. 3 – via Newspapers.com.
- Rose, Cathryn (28 March 1958). "Chester the Jester was once a yodeller!". Hull Daily Mail. No. 22532. p. 12 – via Newspapers.com.
- "Round Leeds Amusements". Yorkshire Evening Post. No. 15881. 9 September 1941. p. 6 – via British Newspaper Archive.
- "Round The Cinemas". Perthshire Advertiser. No. 2101. 24 April 1940. p. 4 – via Newspapers.com.
- "Round the Shows". Aldershot News. No. 2683. 16 November 1945. p. 8 – via Newspapers.com.
- "Round the Shows". Aldershot News. No. 2881. 22 March 1946. p. 8 – via Newspapers.com.
- Roxan, Sidney (2 March 1951). "Hemingway fan would know it blindfolded". Evening Argus. p. 4 – via Newspapers.com.
- R. S. (6 June 1950). "A Very Casual Pair of Murderers". Evening Argus. p. 3 – via Newspapers.com.
- R. S. L. (27 March 1951). "Everywhere he went the white rabbit went too". Derby Evening Telegraph. p. 2 – via Newspapers.com.
- Russell, Gary (12 June 1991). Freeman, John (ed.). "Nostalgia: The Three Doctors". Doctor Who Magazine. No. 174. Marvel Comics UK. pp. 24–28. ISSN 0957-9818.
- Russell, Gary, ed. (1994). "Into the Veil of the Unknown". Doctor Who Magazine. No. Summer Special 1994. Marvel Comics UK. pp. 16A–18A. ISSN 0963-1275.
- "Savoy Brighton". Evening Argus. 8 November 1946. p. 3 – via Newspapers.com.
- S. C. H. (7 July 1939). "Sheffield Playhouse". South Yorkshire Times. p. 16 – via British Newspaper Archive.
- Scheuer, Philip K. (27 April 1946). "War Picture Arrives Late". Los Angeles Times. Vol. 65. p. 13 – via Newspapers.com.
- Schoenfeld, Herman (25 December 1946). "Murder in Reverse (British-Made)". Variety. Vol. 165, no. 3. pp. 12, 24. ISSN 0042-2738.
- "The Screen Review". The Callander Advertiser. Vol. 61, no. 25. 30 March 1946. p. 7 – via Newspapers.com.
- "Shakespeare Theatre". Liverpool Daily Post. No. 22715. 10 April 1928. p. 3 – via Newspapers.com.
- S. H. B. S. (26 July 1924). "Italia Conti's Children". The Sportsman. No. 17135. p. 7 – via British Newspaper Archive.
- "Sheffield". The Stage. No. 3040. 6 July 1939. p. 6 – via British Newspaper Archive.
- Shepherd, Ross (11 January 1948). "Ross Shepherd on the New Films". The Sunday People. No. 3454. p. 4 – via Newspapers.com.
- Shepherd, Ross (28 August 1949). "Films". The Sunday People. No. 3538. p. 3 – via Newspapers.com.
- Skinn, Dez, ed. (17 October 1979). "Entry Number One: William Hartnell". Doctor Who Weekly. No. 1. ISSN 0957-9818.
- Slade, Anthony (17 January 1967). "Dr Who is a wow in panto". Western Daily Press. Vol. 218, no. 35392. p. 5 – via Newspapers.com.
- Sloan, Larry (29 April 1946). "The Way Ahead a Story of British Infantry in Action". Hollywood Citizen-News. Vol. 42, no. 25. p. 6 – via Newspapers.com.
- Smith, Elsie M. (7 July 1960). "That dynamic Charlie is back – in 12 parts". Evening Advertiser. No. 25349. p. 8 – via Newspapers.com.
- Soanes, Wood (7 January 1946). "British War Tale, Saga of Soil Score". Oakland Tribune. Vol. 144, no. 7. p. 4 – via Newspapers.com.
- "Spaceman Bill is Down-to-Earth". Reveille. 7 January 1965. p. 8. OCLC 22099865.
- Spilsbury, Tom, ed. (December 2013). "Gallifrey Guardian". Doctor Who Magazine. No. 476. Panini UK. pp. 7–8. ISSN 0957-9818.
- "Stage & Screen". Buckinghamshire Advertiser. Vol. 108, no. 5760. 23 February 1951. p. 8 – via Newspapers.com.
- "Stage and Screen". Crewe Chronicle. 9 March 1940. p. 9 – via Newspapers.com.
- Stanford, Simon (18 January 1953). "Widow is Young as Ever". Sunday Sun. No. 1746. p. 6 – via Newspapers.com.
- Stanford, Simon (31 March 1963). "The Man Who Tried to Control the Weather". Sunday Sun. No. 2270. p. 6 – via Newspapers.com.
- "Starring in Shaw Play". Daily Mirror. No. 10065. 4 March 1936. p. 18 – via Newspapers.com.
- Stratten, John (11 November 1946). "'Tough Guy' Hartnell Wants to Play Hitler". Manchester Evening News. No. 24170. p. 4 – via Newspapers.com.
- "Strawberry Roan (British-Made)". Variety. Vol. 157, no. 6. 17 January 1945. ISSN 0042-2738.
- S. W. F. W. (27 August 1957). "Tough as they come". Liverpool Daily Post. No. 31826. p. 3 – via Newspapers.com.
- Talb (29 May 1946). "Appointment With Crime (British-Made)". Variety. Vol. 162, no. 12. p. 10. ISSN 0042-2738.
- Tasnier, Maurice (5 January 1968). "Holiday hint for fling in the sun". Western Daily Press. Vol. 220, no. 35640. p. 10 – via Newspapers.com.
- T. C. K. (18 April 1950). "Seagulls Over Sorrento". The Birmingham Post. No. 28606. p. 5 – via Newspapers.com.
- T. C. K. (14 January 1953). "Cinema Shows in Birmingham". The Birmingham Post. No. 29475. p. 4 – via Newspapers.com.
- "Television and Radio". The Courier and Advertiser. No. 36196. 5 June 1969. p. 3 – via British Newspaper Archive.
- "Television and radio". News Letter. No. 33633. 20 May 1963. p. 6 – via British Newspaper Archive.
- "Television Highlights". Miami Daily News. Vol. 60, no. 135. 26 September 1955. p. 17A – via Newspapers.com.
- "Temptation Harbour". Liverpool Daily Post. No. 28588. 19 March 1947. p. 2 – via Newspapers.com.
- "Temptation Harbour". Western Morning News. No. 27199. 26 March 1947. p. 2 – via Newspapers.com.
- "Ten Best Pictures of 1953". Fulham Chronicle. No. 3379. 9 January 1953. p. 10 – via Newspapers.com.
- "The 'Terror' is a Grand-Dad". Birmingham Evening Mail. No. 28564. 18 October 1957. p. 1 – via Newspapers.com.
- "Thames Ditton Actor". Esher News and Advertiser. No. 737. 23 June 1950. p. 2 – via Newspapers.com.
- "Theatre Notes". The Kensington News. No. 4557. 4 May 1956. p. 6 – via Newspapers.com.
- "Theatres: Repertory Theatre". Evening Telegraph. No. 19910. 17 September 1940. p. 4 – via British Newspaper Archive.
- "Theatres: The Young Idea at the Alhambra". The Glasgow Herald. Vol. 149, no. 263. 3 November 1931. p. 9 – via Newspapers.com.
- "This Week's FIlm Shows". Evening Sentinel. No. 25593. 3 December 1946. p. 3 – via Newspapers.com.
- "This Week's Local Attractions". Evening Argus. 11 October 1932. p. 4 – via Newspapers.com.
- Thonger, Edward (1 June 1968). "Tenacity behind the frail look". South Wales Argus. No. 23521. p. 6 – via Newspapers.com.
- T. M. (5 September 1957). "The Strange Life of an Unfortunate Artist". The Sutton and Cheam Advertiser. No. 4634. p. 5 – via Newspapers.com.
- "To Tour". Bournemouth Daily Echo. No. 16676. 2 October 1954. p. 3 – via Newspapers.com.
- "Tonbridge Cinemas". Kent and Sussex Courier. No. 5717. 20 July 1945. p. 3 – via Newspapers.com.
- "Tonight on TV". Evening Express. No. 27754. 22 March 1967. p. 2 – via British Newspaper Archive.
- "Topical Slant on Krushchev". Nottingham Evening News. No. 22574. 16 May 1958. p. 5 – via Newspapers.com.
- Trewin, J. C. (5 July 1950). "At the Theatre..." The Sketch. Vol. 213. pp. 26–27 – via Newspapers.com.
- Trewin, J. C. (13 February 1954). "Cutting a Figure". The Illustrated London News. Vol. 224, no. 5991. p. 244 – via Newspapers.com.
- Trewin, J. C. (16 November 1961). "The Cupboard Was Bare at the Arts". Birmingham Post. No. 32161. p. 24 – via Newspapers.com.
- "TV – Friday". The Age TV Radio Guide and Record Reviews. 20 July 1967. p. 6 – via Newspapers.com.
- "TV personality opens Falmer Church fete". Sussex Express and County Herald. No. 10394. 20 July 1962. p. 1 – via British Newspaper Archive.
- "TV's First Dr Who is Dead". Coventry Evening Telegraph. No. 26050. 24 April 1975. p. 1. ISSN 0307-0425 – via Newspapers.com.
- "Understudy in star role". The Journal. No. 32398. 24 May 1950. p. 3 – via Newspapers.com.
- "Undertown To The Fore!". Esher News and Advertiser. No. 773. 2 March 1951. p. 3 – via Newspapers.com.
- "U. S. play ruled too lurid; British bill to replace it". Daily News. No. 17560. 26 April 1951. p. 8 – via Newspapers.com.
- Usher, Shaun (20 March 1967). "It's down-to-earth with a murder..." Daily Sketch. p. 18 – via Newspapers.com.
- "The Variety World". The Era. Vol. 87, no. 4453. 23 January 1924. p. 10 – via British Newspaper Archive.
- "Vaudeville Sars Face the Microphone". Evening Sentinel. No. 20759. 11 May 1931. p. 7 – via British Newspaper Archive.
- "Victoria Palace". The Stage. No. 2871. 9 April 1936. p. 8 – via British Newspaper Archive.
- "The Victoria Palace". The Stage. No. 2872. 16 April 1936. p. 8 – via British Newspaper Archive.
- Viney, Michael (6 April 1956). "A thump from Bill". Evening Argus – via Newspapers.com.
- Ward, Simon (14 August 1957). "Not so tough". Daily Sketch. p. 4 – via Newspapers.com.
- Wardour (8 April 1947). "Not Harmful for FIlm to be 'Stolen' from Star". Gloucestershire Live. p. 5 – via Newspapers.com.
- Wardour (17 January 1948). "Drama Rules the Screen". Herald of Wales. No. 7042. p. 3 – via Newspapers.com.
- Wardour (29 August 1949). "These Old-Stagers Still Have Charm". Leicester Evening Mail. No. 12074. p. 4 – via Newspapers.com.
- Wardour (6 April 1957). "Ordinary face is his fortune". Leicester Evening Mail. No. 14439. p. 4 – via Newspapers.com.
- Waterman, John (18 September 1958). "This man Curtis—how he has grown!". Evening Standard. No. 41762. p. 6 – via Newspapers.com.
- Waters, Jim (31 January 1953). "Next Week's Shows in Derby". Derby Evening Telegraph. No. 22282. p. 3 – via Newspapers.com.
- Waters, Jim (11 February 1956). "Slaughter is Back". Derby Evening Telegraph. No. 23224. p. 39 – via Newspapers.com.
- Watkins, Leslie (6 June 1958). "Bullimore blasts the Army Game". The Daily Sketch. p. 13 – via Newspapers.com.
- "The Way Ahead at 20th Century is Simple Story". The Daily Alaska Empire. Vol. 66, no. 10235. 3 April 1946. p. 5 – via Newspapers.com.
- "Wedding Day Smiles". The Evening News. No. 22051. 21 October 1952. p. 5 – via British Newspaper Archive.
- "The Week On Stage And Screen". Huddersfield Daily Examiner. No. 25199. 26 June 1945. p. 3 – via Newspapers.com.
- "The Week's Best Films". Middlesex County Times and West Middlesex Gazette. No. 5097. 20 October 1945. p. 4 – via Newspapers.com.
- "The Week's Shows at Cinemas". Evening Sentinel. No. 21803. 18 September 1934. p. 7 – via Newspapers.com.
- "Westleigh". Leicester Mercury. 13 April 1937. p. 18 – via Newspapers.com.
- "What to See Next Week". The Yorkshire Post. No. 29354. 6 September 1941. p. 5 – via British Newspaper Archive.
- "What's On To-Day". Middlesex County Times. Vol. 74, no. 4652. 10 April 1937. p. 8 – via Newspapers.com.
- W. H. B. (26 April 1932). "First Production of a New Farce". Birmingham Gazette. No. 27470. p. 5 – via Newspapers.com.
- W. H. B. (13 October 1936). "Shakespeare, Thriller, Comedy and Vaudeville". Birmingham Gazette. No. 28857. p. 3 – via Newspapers.com.
- W. H. G. (1 December 1931). "The Young Idea at the Royal". Birmingham Gazette. No. 27347. p. 9 – via Newspapers.com.
- Whit (29 November 1946). "Films Next Week". Liverpool Echo. No. 20847 – via Newspapers.com.
- White, Matt (7 February 1965). "Dr Who? I hypnotise myself, says the Professor". Sunday Mirror. No. 97. p. 23 – via Newspapers.com.
- Whitley, Reg (9 June 1944). "The screen salutes our soldiers". Daily Mirror. No. 12629. p. 7 – via Newspapers.com.
- Whitley, Reg (19 October 1945). "British—and a winner all the way". Daily Mirror. No. 13051. p. 7 – via Newspapers.com.
- Whitley, Reg (5 April 1957). "Joan is All at Sea!". Daily Mirror. No. 16582. p. 12 – via Newspapers.com.
- Wiggin, Maurice (13 October 1936). "Realistic Thriller Has No Gangster, No Ghost". Evening Despatch. No. 14131. p. 12 – via Newspapers.com.
- "William Hartnell's daughter marries". Evening Standard. No. 39953. 21 October 1952. p. 7 – via Newspapers.com.
- "William Hartnell, star of Appointment with Crime, tackles Birmingham Forum manager, R. H. L. Morgan". Evening Despatch. No. 17283. 10 December 1946. p. 3 – via Newspapers.com.
- "William Hartnell, star of Murder In Reverse, made a personal appearance at the showing of the film at the Regal and Coliseum cinemas, Glasgow, last night". Daily Record. No. 15621. 30 October 1945. p. 8 – via Newspapers.com.
- Williams, Lionel (14 October 1945). "Young love in Iowa". Sunday Express. p. 7 – via British Newspaper Archive.
- Williams, Lionel (21 October 1945). "We discover our own Ann Todd". Sunday Express. p. 7 – via British Newspaper Archive.
- "The Windmill Man". The Era. Vol. 87, no. 4450. 2 January 1924. p. 40 – via British Newspaper Archive.
- "The Windmill Man Again". The Stage. No. 2232. 29 December 1923. p. 8 – via British Newspaper Archive.
- "The Windmill Man at the Victoria Palace". The Stage. No. 2233. 3 January 1924. p. 16 – via British Newspaper Archive.
- Withers, F. Leslie (23 March 1947). "A great new British child star". Sunday Mercury. No. 1472. p. 12 – via Newspapers.com.
- "Women's Institutes' News". Kent and Sussex Courier. 31 July 1981. p. 2 – via British Newspaper Archive.
- Worsley, T. C. (24 June 1950). "Seagulls Over Sorrento, at the Apollo". New Statesman and Nation. Vol. 39, no. 1007. p. 712.
- Wright, Basil (February 1951). "The Director: Carol Reed". Sight and Sound. Vol. 19, no. 10, Films in 1951: Festival of Britain. British Film Institute. pp. 10–13. ISSN 0037-4806.
- Wright, Mark, ed. (7 September 2016). "The Savages, The War Machines, The Smugglers and The Tenth Planet". Doctor Who: The Complete History. 8 (27). London: Panini Comics, Hachette Partworks. ISSN 2057-6048.
- Wright, Mark, ed. (14 June 2017). "Galaxy 4, 'Mission to the Unknown', The Myth Makers and The Daleks' Master Plan". Doctor Who: The Complete History. 6 (47). London: Panini Comics, Hachette Partworks. ISSN 2057-6048.
- Wright, Mark, ed. (13 June 2018). "The Massacre of St Bartholomew's Eve, The Ark, The Celestial Toymaker and The Gunfighters". Doctor Who: The Complete History. 7 (73). London: Panini Comics, Hachette Partworks. ISSN 2057-6048.
- Wright, Mark, ed. (23 January 2019). "'World Enough and Time'/'The Doctor Falls' and 'Twice Upon a Time'". Doctor Who: The Complete History. 89 (89). London: Panini Comics, Hachette Partworks. ISSN 2057-6048.
- "Wrong side". Bournemouth Daily Echo. No. 15391. 12 August 1950. p. 3 – via Newspapers.com.
- Wynne, Freda (9 November 1946). "One Oasis in Desert of Sound". Manchester Evening News. No. 24169. p. 2 – via Newspapers.com.
- Wynne, Freda (24 January 1948). "Seaside Spivvery". Manchester Evening News. No. 24542. p. 2 – via Newspapers.com.
- Yorke, Colin (6 June 1958). "Dial 999 Brings a Million Dollars". Birmingham Weekly Post. No. 6046. p. 7 – via Newspapers.com.
- "Yorkshire Entertainments: Light-Hearted Comedy at Leeds Royal". The Yorkshire Post. No. 29356. 9 September 1941. p. 3 – via British Newspaper Archive.
- "Young Member of Cast Proves Star". The Vancouver Daily Province. 27 January 1928. p. 21 – via Newspapers.com.
- Zimmerman, Nathan B. (26 December 1928). "McLeod Company Excels in Bill of Divorcement". Winnipeg Evening Tribune. Vol. 39, no. 309. p. 4 – via Newspapers.com.

=== Online sources ===
- Allen, Christopher (5 October 2013). "Hartnell: 'The Daleks were difficult to play to'". DoctorWho.tv. BBC Studios. Archived from the original on 25 May 2022.
- Belam, Martin (28 October 2016). "The day Doctor Who changed face – and transformed TV forever". The Guardian. Archived from the original on 29 October 2016.
- Belam, Martin (3 May 2024). "The greatest Doctor Who – ranked!". The Guardian. Archived from the original on 3 May 2024.
- Braxton, Mark (20 November 2008). "The Dalek Invasion of Earth". Radio Times. BBC Magazines. Archived from the original on 19 September 2020.
- Brew, Simon (25 January 2008). "Doctor Who: The Time Meddler DVD review". Den of Geek. Dennis Publishing. Archived from the original on 8 October 2020.
- "Carney, Heather Anne (probate number 1767713044760162)". gov.uk. 17 January 2026.
- CV (3 July 2008). "Dr Who profile: Britain's favourite alien". The Telegraph. Archived from the original on 5 July 2008.
- "Dr Who actors honoured". BBC News. BBC. 19 May 2002. Archived from the original on 19 December 2002.
- Evans, Ian (22 November 2013). "Doctor Who: 50 years on, global acclaim for a distinctly British TV icon". The Christian Science Monitor. Archived from the original on 23 November 2013.
- Honey, Sam (10 December 2023). "The life of Doctor Who icon William Hartnell in Kent village as 60th anniversary special airs". KentLive. Reach plc. Archived from the original on 16 December 2023.
- Jeffery, Morgan (23 October 2022). "Doctor Who brings back classic Doctors for centenary special". Radio Times. Immediate Media Company. Archived from the original on 23 October 2022.
- Jones, Paul (29 January 2013). "Doctor Who: Mark Gatiss reveals casting for An Adventure in Space and Time". Radio Times. Immediate Media Company. Archived from the original on 31 January 2013.
- Lawrence, Ben (30 January 2024). "Waris Hussein: 'I am so angry the BBC sold Television Centre. They destroyed the world they had'". The Telegraph. Archived from the original on 30 January 2024.
- Leston, Ryan (8 April 2022). "Doctor Who's Regeneration Was A Sci-Fi Solution To A Real-World Problem". /Film. Static Media. Archived from the original on 14 March 2026.
- Marcus (14 October 2018). "DWAS Honours William Hartnell". Doctor Who News. Archived from the original on 15 October 2018.
- Masters, Tim (13 November 2013). "Doctor Who drama 'a wonderful tribute' to William Hartnell". BBC. Archived from the original on 11 July 2014.
- Mulkern, Patrick (31 March 2008). "Interview: Nicholas Courtney – we speak to the man who played the Brigadier in Doctor Who". Radio Times. BBC Magazines. Archived from the original on 17 October 2013.
- Mulkern, Patrick (20 February 2009). "The Massacre of St Bartholomew's Eve". Radio Times. BBC Magazines. Archived from the original on 12 February 2021.
- Mulkern, Patrick (16 October 2013). "Doctor Who's Waris Hussein on William Hartnell, Bette Davis, and Peter Cook loathing David Frost". Radio Times. Immediate Media Company. Archived from the original on 16 July 2021.
- "Name: W H Hartnell. Service number: 7920420. Date of birth: 8 January 1908". The National Archives. Archived from the original on 20 July 2026.
- Norton, Charles (22 August 2013). "Doctor Who: the rediscovered William Hartnell interview". The Guardian. Archived from the original on 22 August 2013.
- Rodrigues, Jason (22 August 2014). "Doctor Who from the archive: William Hartnell, the first Doctor". The Guardian. Archived from the original on 23 August 2014.
- Rouner, Jef (14 February 2013). "Doctor Who: The Strange Legacy of The First Doctor and William Hartnell". Houston Press. Archived from the original on 30 October 2020.
- Smith, Neil (17 July 2017). "All the Doctors, from William Hartnell to Jodie Whittaker". BBC News. BBC. Archived from the original on 16 July 2017.
- Somerville, Matthew. "William Hartnell". Theatricalia. Archived from the original on 12 July 2026.
- Sweney, Mark (16 October 2013). "Doctor Who director exposes William Hartnell as reluctant first Time Lord". The Guardian. Archived from the original on 17 October 2013.
- Westthorp, Alex (28 March 2014). "Doctor Who: the film careers of William Hartnell & Jon Pertwee". Den of Geek. Archived from the original on 25 September 2021.
- Wilkins, Jonathan (31 January 2008). "Doctor Who: The Time Meddler". Total Sci-Fi Online. Titan Magazines. Archived from the original on 12 September 2011.
- Zemler, Emily (25 July 2013). "Doctor Who celebrates 50 years with biopic and new Doctor". CNN. Archived from the original on 6 August 2013.

=== Media sources ===
- Chapman, Chris (director/producer) (14 October 2013). Frozen Out: The Making of The Tenth Planet (documentary). 2 Entertainment.
- Plomley, Roy; Hartnell, William (23 August 1965). Desert Island Discs (Radio broadcast). BBC Home Service. Archived from the original on 19 March 2018.
- Vanezis, Paul (director/producer) (5 December 2022). Maureen O'Brien: In Conversation (documentary). BBC Studios.
- Wills, Anneke; Matthews, Christopher; Cameron, Earl; White, Alan; Van Der Maaten, Donald; Dunham, Christopher; Kindred, Peter; Hadoke, Toby (2013). The Tenth Planet (audio commentary). 2 Entertain.
