= FindaProperty =

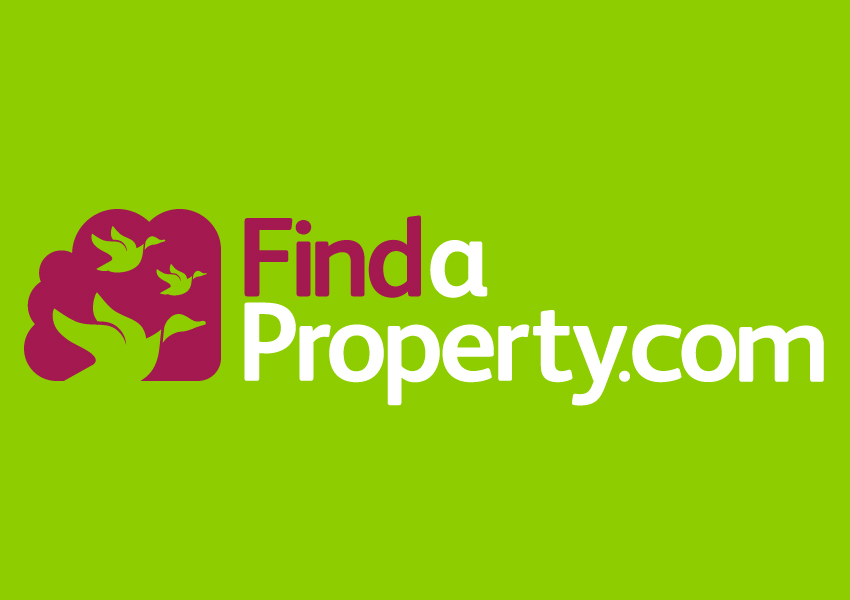
- FindaProperty.com logo before merger with Zoopla
- Company type: Public
- Traded as: Public
- Industry: Property Market Website
- Founded: 1997; 29 years ago
- Founder: Andrew Pendery
- Defunct: 2012; 14 years ago
- Fate: Merged with Zoopla
- Successors: Zoopla; ZPG Ltd
- Headquarters: London, England, UK
- Area served: United Kingdom
- Products: Commercial sales and lettings; Listings website
- Total equity: ▼
- Owner: ZPG Ltd
- Website: findaproperty.com

FindaProperty.com, prior to a 2012 merger with Zoopla, was a commercial sales and lettings listings website for the UK consumer residential housing market. It had offices in London and Brighton and listed approximately a million properties uploaded by estate agents for a monthly fee.

In April 2012 the Office of Fair Trading (OFT) agreed a merger between findaproperty.com and Zoopla. Since the merger the findaproperty.com brand was deprecated and the findaproperty.com domain now points to the Zoopla website.

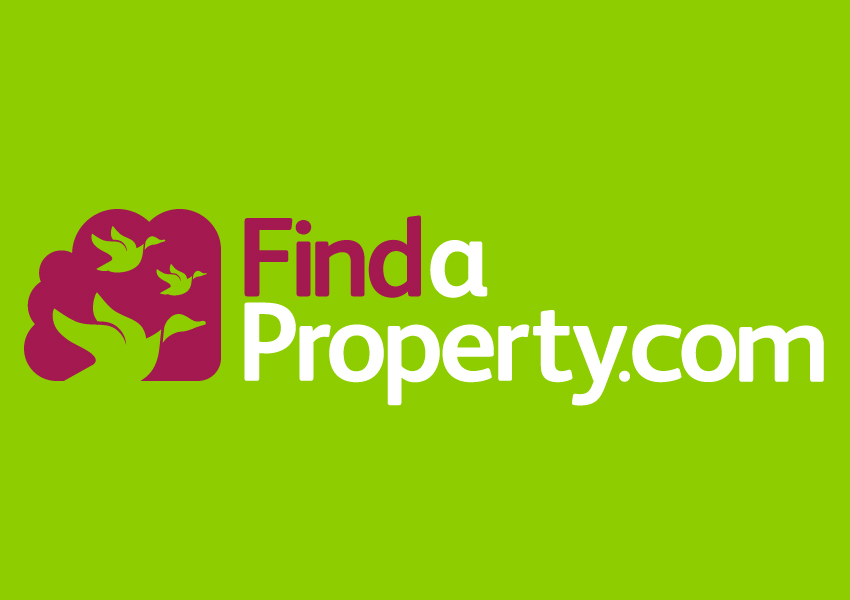
The FindaProperty.com logo

The portal was started in 1997 by businessman and entrepreneur Andrew Pendery who had experience of the US property market and saw a gap in the UK one for an online listings portal. He began the site in his London bedroom and with the help of salesman Ferenc Schustek, achieved initial growth. He then moved the business to Brighton at offices in West Street and later, Dyke Road. The site's first listings were in London and Surrey, the UK's busiest property markets and 'hot-spots' for high house prices.

== History ==
While the business was in Brighton Pendery, with editor Mike O'Flynn and information technology specialist Simon D'Urso, expanded the business significantly, enough to attract venture capital money. In early 2004 businessmen Neil Anderson along with Simon D'Urso bought Pendery out for £2.8 million, financed by Barclays Ventures, who put David Garrett - who later went on to work for Figleaves.com - into the business to oversee its investment.

In November 2004 the site was sold to Associated Newspapers, the publisher of The Daily Mail, The Mail on Sunday and Metro for £8 million. In 2008 parent group the Daily Mail and General Trust (DMGT) set up The Digital Property Group (through DMGT subsidiary A&N Media) to which it added Primelocation.com in 2006 for £48 million and Globrix in 2009 for £7 million.

FindaProperty.com increased the number of properties it lists significantly since being sold to DMGT from some 75,000 in early 2004 to nearly 800,000 in November 2010. Functionality additions to the site outside its property search engine for sales, rental, auction and investment properties included being the launch partner for Google Street View UK (March 2009) and the first property website in the UK to integrate Street View into property details and area information pages.

An iPhone App with augmented reality was created with the launch of a TV advertising campaign starring actor Ross Green, who plays a variety of characters rapping about property. In late 2011 a proposed merger between FindaProperty.com's parent company the Digital Property Group and rival Zoopla.com was announced, subject to approval from the relevant business competition authorities in the UK. This merger was later agreed by the OFT.

== See also ==
- Property portal
- Zoopla
- Rightmove
- Nestoria
- Nuroa
- finda.in
