= OnTheMarket =

British residential property search web portal

OnTheMarket.com
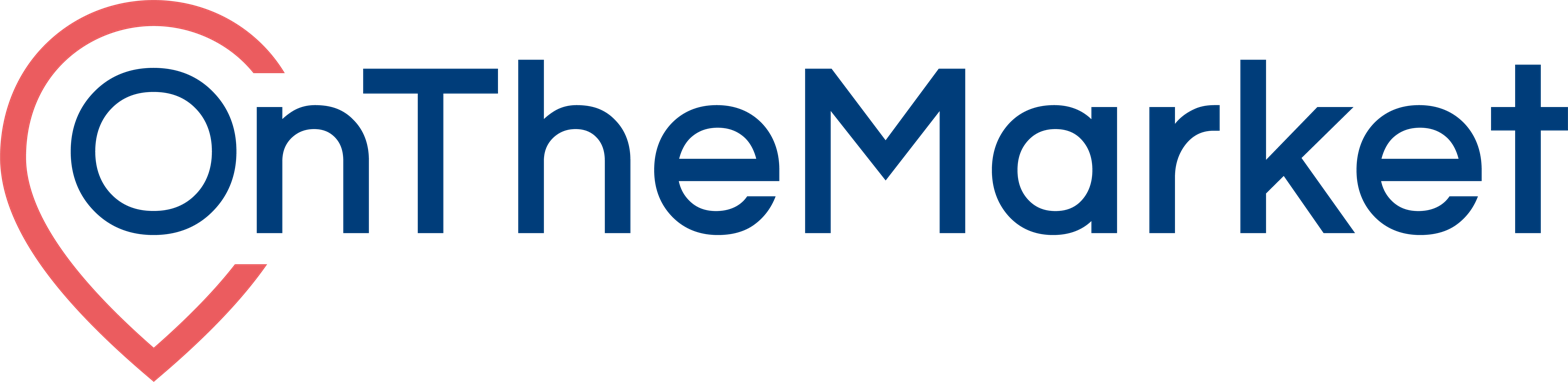
- Website type: Website
- Founded: January 26, 2015; 11 years ago
- Headquarters: London, {{{location_country}}}
- Area served: Great Britain
- Owner: CoStar Group (2023–present)
- Key people: Jason Tebb (CEO)
- Industry: Search, property, housing
- Services: Property search and research
- Website: onthemarket.com

OnTheMarket.com is a United Kingdom property portal similar to Rightmove and Zoopla. In October 2023, it was announced that the firm would be acquired by CoStar Group for £99 million. On December 12, the Washington, D.C.–based property data company reported having completed the purchase of OnTheMarket plc.

== Operations ==
OnTheMarket displays hundreds of thousands of properties that are available for sale or to rent every month. In addition, OnTheMarket also displays thousands of new properties for sale or to rent every month, 24 hours or more before they appear on Rightmove or Zoopla to give serious property seekers an edge in their property search. These properties are labelled as Only With Us on the site and feature a countdown clock to show how long there is until these properties will also be made available to Rightmove or Zoopla. OnTheMarket also displays properties which are totally exclusive to their site, these properties are labelled as Only With Us but don't feature the countdown clock.

As well as UK residential properties for sale and to rent, OnTheMarket also displays thousands of UK commercial properties for sale and to rent as well as overseas properties available for sale.

Following a full rebrand in December 2021, OnTheMarket has upgraded its website to improve user experience and functionality with the inclusion of tools such as Wish List, which allows home movers to specify features they’d like in their next property in order to filter search results, and Ask The Agent which allows users to register their interest in homes not yet advertised for sale.

Users can see properties located on Google Maps as part of property listings and HM Land Registry data is available to provide searchers with sold house prices.

== History ==
In 2013, estate agents including Knight Frank, Savills, Strutt & Parker, Chestertons, Douglas & Gordon and Glentree Estates founded Agents' Mutual Ltd. The company launched its portal OnTheMarket.com in January 2015.

OnTheMarket members signed up to a 'one other portal' rule as a measure they saw as necessary for the portal to enter the UK market, which was overwhelmingly dominated by two players.

On 5 July 2017 the Competition Appeal Tribunal ruled OnTheMarket.com's one other portal rule - which stipulates estate agent members can list on a maximum of one other competing portal - is not anti-competitive. This judgement was supported in January 2019 by the Court of Appeal.

In September 2017, Members of Agents’ Mutual voted 89% in favour of demutualisation of the company to introduce a new parent company – OnTheMarket plc – in preparation for the admission to the AIM market of the London Stock Exchange.

On 9 February 2018 OnTheMarket plc was admitted to the AIM market of the London Stock Exchange.

On 14 December 2020, Jason Tebb was appointed as the new Chief Executive. His background of 20+ years in property makes him the only CEO of a major property portal who has previously been an estate agent.

Within the first 12 months of his tenure, CEO Jason Tebb oversaw the implementation of a new website design, logo and branding which launched in December 2021, encompassing the largest upgrade to OnTheMarket's features and functionality since the original site was launched in 2015. The new-look portal features additional products, services and functionality to support OnTheMarket's strategy of building a differentiated, tech-enabled property business and has been developed to provide the most relevant experience for consumers aimed at increasing engagement with serious and active property-seekers.

== See also ==
- FindaProperty
- Rightmove
- Zoopla
- Primelocation
