= Globrix =

British real estate search engine (2008–2012)

Globrix was a UK real estate search engine that was launched in January 2008. It was launched as a joint venture with News International, publishers of The Sunday Times, The Sun, The Times, The News of the World and Thelondonpaper.

Estate agents and letting agents could list their properties for free. This competed with traditional paid-listings sites such as Rightmove (originally a joint venture among four of the UK's largest property agents, now a public limited company), Propertyfinder (also partly backed by News International) and Primelocation (owned by Daily Mail and General Trust). Unlike most property websites, Globrix directed users to agent websites rather than hosting the property details and capturing the lead on Globrix itself. Globrix gathered its property listings in three different ways; crawling agent websites, taking data feeds and by agents manually uploading via the Globrix extranet. Because Globrix was 'free to list', Globrix was able to gain substantial market coverage and claimed to list more properties than any other UK property website. Unlike websites like Gumtree and Oodle, private sellers and landlords were not allowed to list their properties on the site.

The website charged property professionals and property related services companies for geo-targeted banner ads. There were also premium services available to estate and letting agents (such as Search Engine Optimization consultancy, branded email alerts and increased traffic) and Google Ads were displayed in unsold advertising positions on the right hand side of search results.

== Functionality ==
The basic property search functionality is kept simple with just one text box on the homepage. Users can search for property by location (e.g. city, town, full postcode, partial postcode or, unusually for property portals, street name), places of interest (e.g. schools, stations, landmarks) or by key features (e.g. swimming pool, garden, double glazing, helipad).

Search results can then be refined further by changing the price parameters, number of bedrooms and bathrooms, property type (e.g. detached, bungalow, flat), outside space, nearby stations and schools and property features (e.g. wooden floors, sea view). Registered users are able to search by additional parameters such as price change.

As an alternative to the regular 'list view' of property results, users can also opt to see the search results plotted on Bing Maps (previously they used Google Maps) to allow users to look for property by location. (Some users are unimpressed with the lack of precision of the inferior Bing offering, which often manages to put the marker in a field, compared to the accuracy and ease of use of Googlemaps). Users are able to drag and zoom the map, with relevant properties automatically placed in view. It is also possible for users to draw a catchment area directly onto the map of where they would like to search.

== Data ==
Globrix data was sometimes used by the national media to illustrate stories on house prices, the economy, area trends, consumer confidence and the property market.

== Awards ==
In 2008, Globrix won 'Estate Agency Service Firm of the Year' at The Negotiator Awards.

== Founders ==
Globrix was founded by Dan Lee and Ian Parry, both ex employees of UK-based search company Autonomy and the Norwegian search company FAST.

== Merged with Zoopla ==
In December 2012 Globrix merged with Zoopla.
