= Affordability of housing in the United Kingdom =

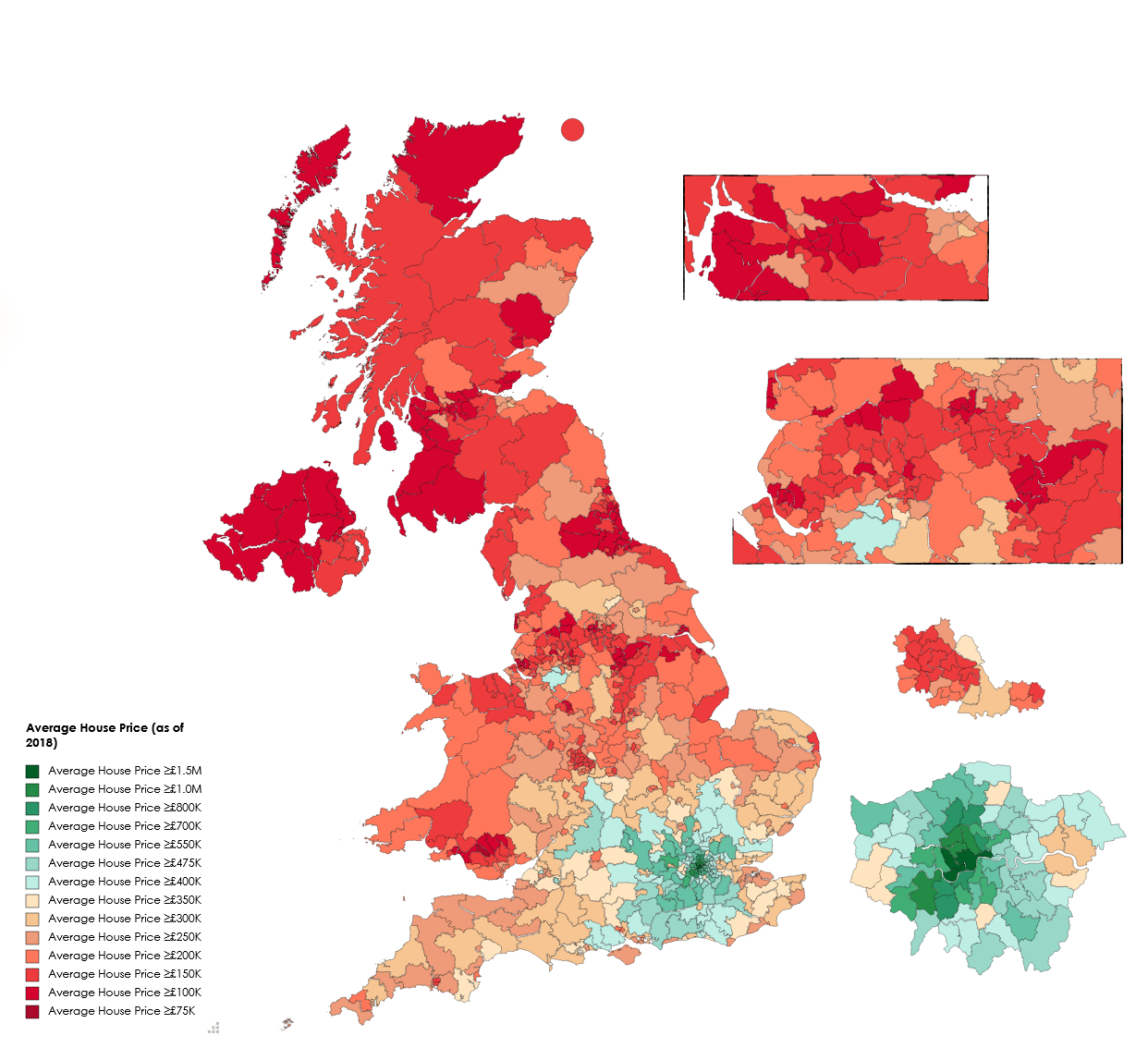
The average price of a residential property in the UK as of 2019

The affordability of housing in the UK reflects the ability to rent or buy property. There are various ways to determine or estimate housing affordability. One commonly used metric is the median housing affordability ratio; this compares the median price paid for residential property to the median gross annual earnings for full-time workers. According to official government statistics, housing affordability worsened between 2020 and 2021, and since 1997 housing affordability has worsened overall, especially in London. The most affordable local authorities in 2021 were in the North West, Wales, Yorkshire and The Humber, West Midlands and North East.

Housing tenure in the UK has the following main types: Owner-occupied, private rented sector (PRS), and social rented sector (SRS). The affordability of housing in the UK varies widely on a regional basis – house prices and rents will differ as a result of market factors such as the state of the local economy, transport links, and the supply of housing.

== Key determinants of affordability ==
For owner-occupied properties, key determinants of affordability are house prices, income, interest rates, and purchase costs. For rented property, PRS rents will largely be a reflection of house prices, while SRS rents are set by Local Authorities, Housing Associations or similar.

== House prices ==
Land Registry figures for England and Wales show that housing prices rose from £70,000 to £224,000 in the 20 years between 1998 and 2018. Growth was almost continuous during the period, save for two years of decline around 2008 as a result of the 2008 financial crisis.

=== Regional and property-type variation since 2020 ===
A 2026 repeat-sales analysis by the property data company Move Insights, which compared 21,722 properties in HM Land Registry Price Paid Data that sold in both 2020 and the 12 months to February 2026, reported a median five-year price increase of 24% across England and Wales. The analysis described a marked regional divergence in which every region of northern England, the Midlands and Wales had appreciated faster than every southern region, while London recorded the lowest median growth at around 11%; Oldham was identified as the fastest-growing local market at 44.8%. It also reported a widening gap between houses and flats, with the median flat up 10.7% against 25-28% for the three main house types, and around one in seven flats - and almost one in five London flats - reselling below its 2020 price.

=== House price averages compared to average salary ===
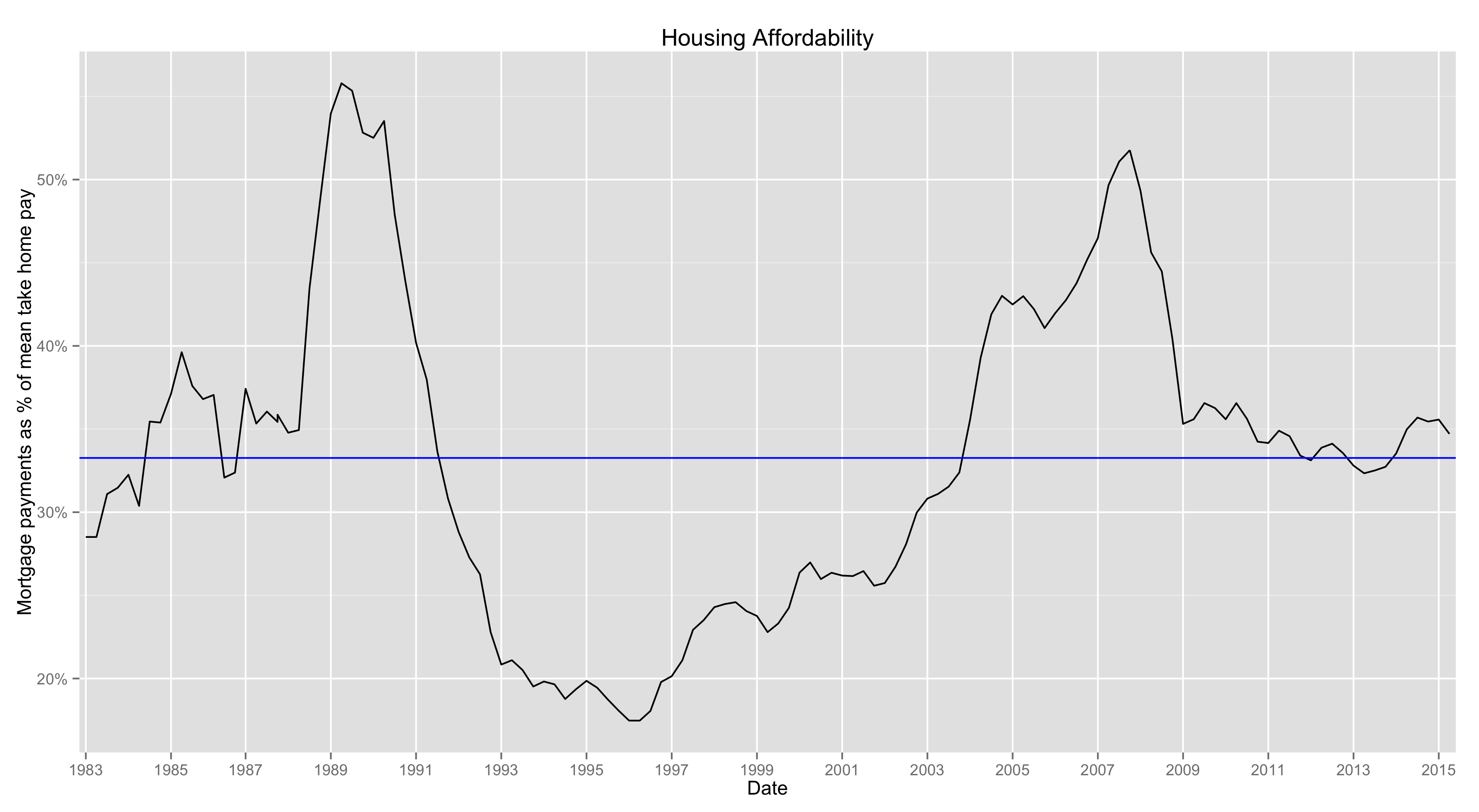
United Kingdom housing affordability as described by mortgage payments as a percentage of take-home pay from 1983 to 2015

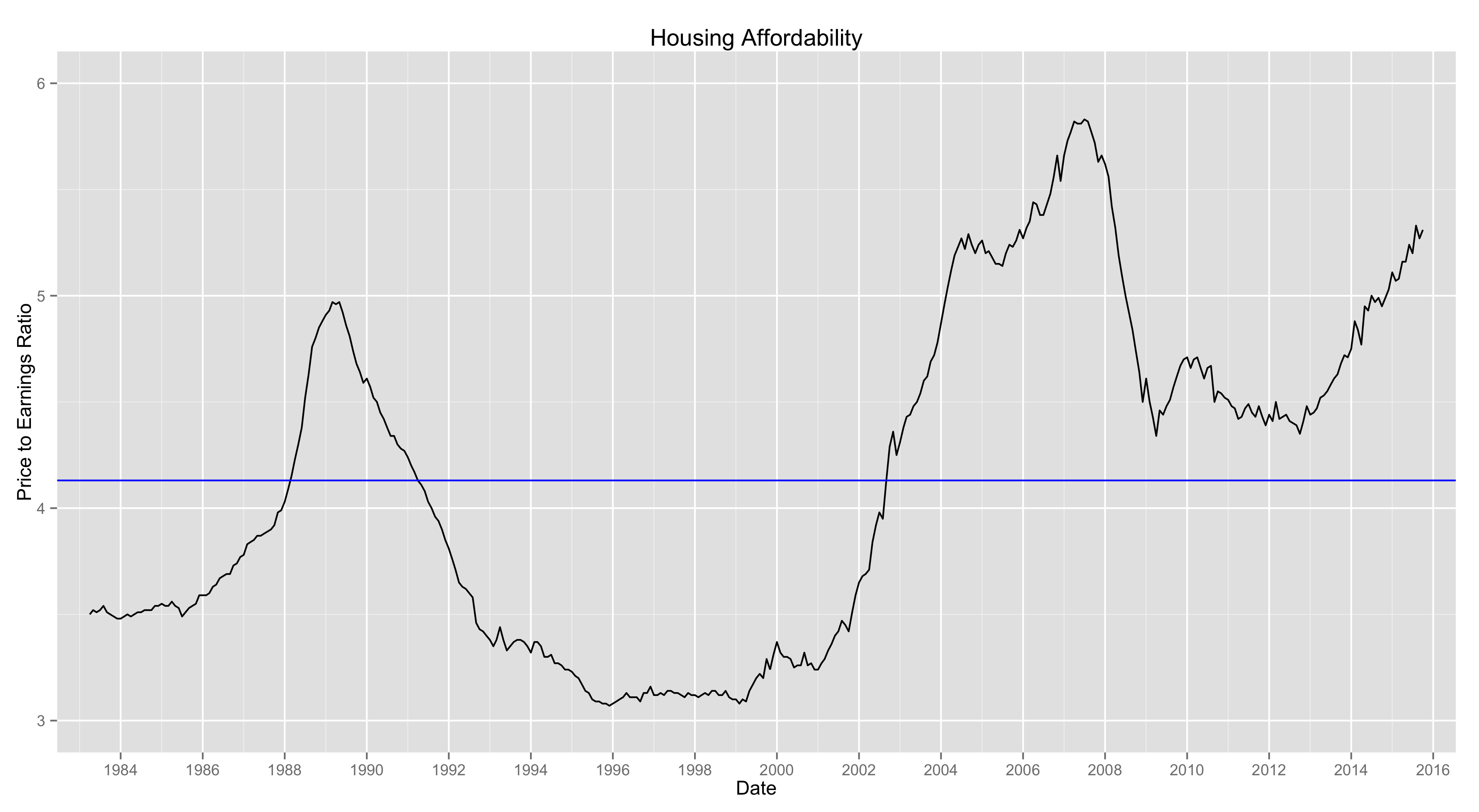
United Kingdom housing affordability as described by house price to earnings ratio from 1984 to 2015

The gap between average income and average housing prices changed between 1985 and 2015 from twice an average salary to up to six times average income. Median house prices in London the median house now cost up to 12 times the median London salary. In 1995, the median house price was £83,000, 4.4 times the median income. By 2012–13, the median income in London had increased to £24,600 and the median London house price had increased to £300,000, 12.2 times median income

In 1995, the Bank base rate was 6%, in March 2009 it stood at 0.5% until August 2016 when it was further reduced to 0.25%.

=== Effect of planning restrictions on house prices ===
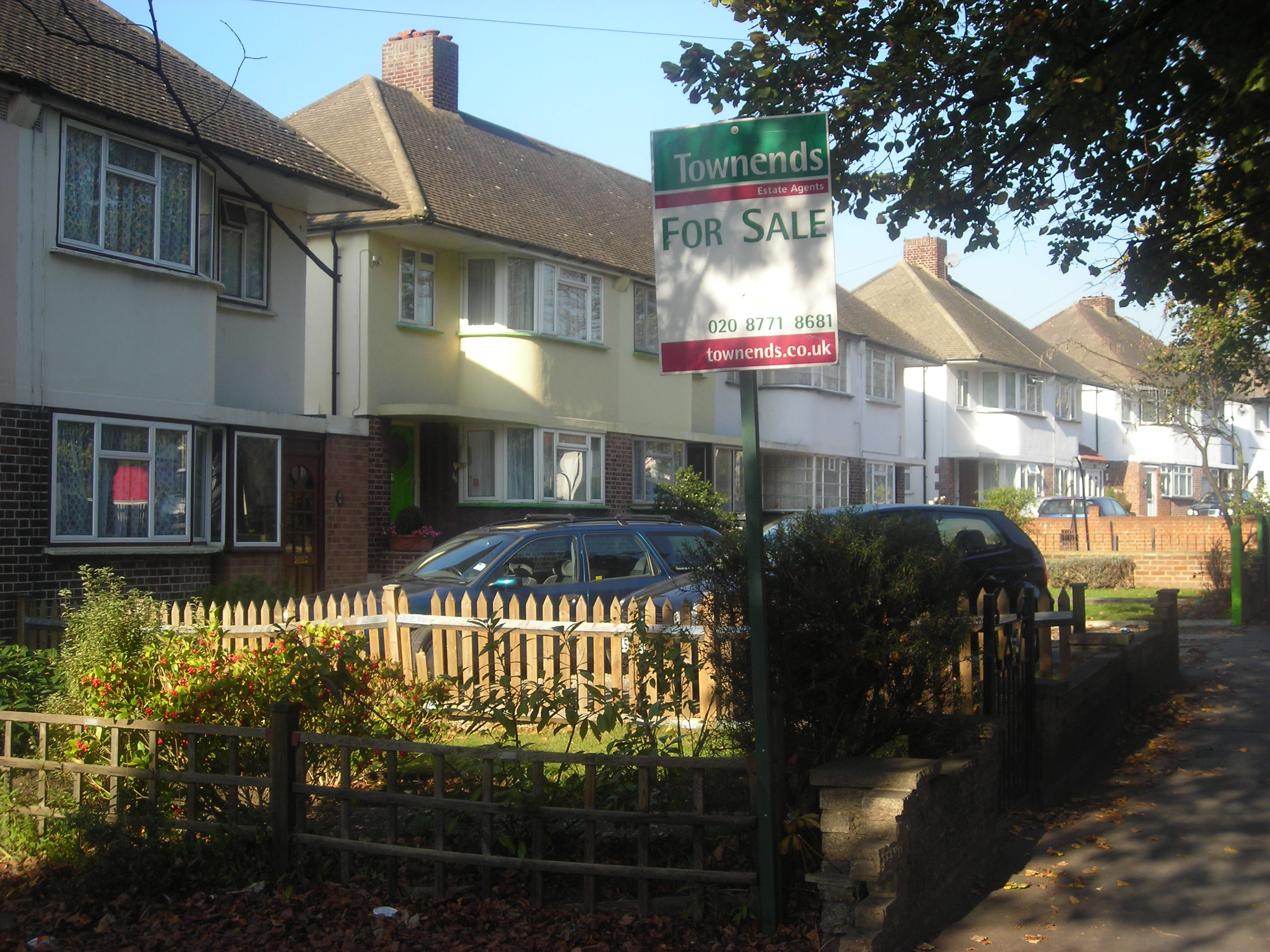
A semi-detached house for sale in London zone 5 (Croydon) in 2007

An analysis by the LSE and the Dutch Bureau for Economic Policy Analysis found that house prices in England would have been 35% cheaper without regulatory constraints. A report by the Adam Smith Institute found that by using 4% of London's green belt, one million homes could be built within a 10-minute walk of a railway station.

The Economist has criticised green belt policy, saying that unless more houses are built through reforming planning laws and releasing green belt land, then housing space will need to be rationed out. It noted that if general inflation had risen as fast as housing prices had since 1971, a chicken would cost £51; and that Britain is "building less homes today than at any point since the 1920s". According to the free-market thinktank Institute of Economic Affairs, there is "overwhelming empirical evidence that planning restrictions have a substantial impact on housing costs" and are the main reason why housing was two and a half times more expensive in 2011 than it was in 1975.

The Campaign to Protect Rural England argued that "Green Belt land is important for our wider environment, providing us with the trees and the undeveloped land which reduce the effect of the heat generated by big cities. Instead of reducing this green space, we should be using it to its best effect. We know from our research that three-quarters (79%) of the population would like to see more trees planted and more food grown in the areas around towns and cities."

A policy paper by planning academics in 2023, Planning for the Public, argued that planning in the UK was not particularly restrictive and instead suffers from a lack of funding and previous rounds of policy 'streamlining' which have created significant ambiguity in policy frameworks.

=== Valuation of land and effect on house prices ===
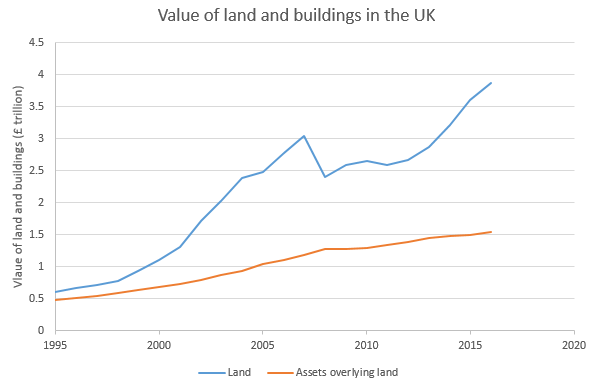
Value of land and buildings in the UK from 1995 to 2016 (trillions)

Property companies state that land values follow house prices and that a developer assesses what new build house price is achievable in any particular location with reference to prices and sales rates in the second-hand market and on nearby comparable new build sites. At a basic level (assuming no affordable housing, S106 or CIL), they then multiply that new build house price by the number of homes to be built on the land and to arrive at the gross development value (GDV) of the site. The underlying value of the land is then the GDV less the cost of development and less an allowance for profit.

According to a study by Knoll, Schularick and Steger, up to 80% of the rise in houses prices between 1950 and 2012 can be attributed to the increasing price of land. This is for two reasons. Firstly, before 1950 improving transport meant that more and more land was economically usable, but this effect subsided after 1950. Secondly, zoning restrictions did not allow the "utilisation of additional land".

In 2015, the Department for Communities and Local Government shared the land value estimates for residential land, agricultural land and industrial land. It found that the average price of a typical agricultural plot was £21,000.

== Property costs ==
The principal taxes imposed by the central government are Stamp Duty and Value Added Tax (VAT). Other costs which are associated with the buying and selling of property are estate agent fees, conveyancing and survey fees, mortgage arrangement fees (where applicable), and removal costs.

=== Stamp duty land tax ===
Stamp duty land tax (SDLT) is payable on property transactions in England and Northern Ireland. Tax is paid at different rates on different portions of the purchase price. For example, on a £600,000 house, no tax is paid on the first £250,000, and the portion (£350,000) in the £250,000-£925,000 tax band is charged at 5%, i.e. £17,500. This gives a total tax of £17,500.

Purchase price of property	Rate of SDLT on portion of purchase price
£40,000 – £250,000	0%
£250,001 – £925,000	5%
£925,001 – £1,500,000	10%
Over £1,500,000	12%

Scotland and Wales apply their own tax to property transactions, replacing SDLT. Scotland introduced the Land and Buildings Transaction Tax in 2015, and Wales introduced the Land Transaction Tax in 2018.

=== Estate agent fees ===
In 2011, Which? magazine found the national average estate agents' fees to be 1.8%. Fees can range between 0.75% to 3% depending on the location in the UK.

=== Survey ===
There are four main types of survey: a valuation survey, a condition report, a homebuyer report and a full structural survey.

=== Legal fees ===
Conveyancing fees vary according to the value of the property and the service provided.

=== Mortgage arrangement fees ===
In April 2013, The Daily Telegraph reported that research by Moneyfacts showed the average mortgage arrangement fee to be £1522.

== Housing shortage ==
In 2020, the BBC reported the UK's housing gap was in excess of one million homes, and previously (in 2019) that "An estimated 8.4 million people in England are living in an unaffordable, insecure or unsuitable home, according to the National Housing Federation". Unaffordable housing is defined by the Affordable Housing Commission as to where housing costs are above 30% of household income. In a government briefing paper, 'Tackling the under-supply of housing in England', Barton and Wilson describe England's housing need as being illustrated by issues "such as increased levels of overcrowding, acute affordability issues, more young people living with their parents for longer periods, impaired labour mobility resulting in businesses finding it difficult to recruit and retain staff, and increased levels of homelessness".

Despite an added 244,000 homes to England's housing stock in 2019/20, the notion that an increased supply of housing will improve affordability has been challenged: the UK Housing Review (September 2017) states, "Indeed as the evidence to the Redfern Review from Oxford Economics reminds us, it is unlikely to bring house prices down except in the very long term and with sustained high output of new homes relative to household growth. Even boosting (UK) housing supply to 310,000 homes per annum in their model only brings a five per cent fall in the baseline forecast of house prices". Therefore, the National Housing Federation (NHF) and Crisis from Heriot-Watt University argue that alongside the needed 340,000 new homes each year (until 2031), 145,000 of those “must be affordable homes”.

An overall shortage of affordable housing, coupled with rising rents and rapidly increasing demand for housing, was identified as a significant driver of homelessness in England, by a systems-wide evaluation of homelessness and rough sleeping commissioned by the Ministry of Housing, Communities and Local Government and undertaken by the Centre for Homelessness Impact.

== Other factors affecting affordability ==
=== Council tax ===
The Joseph Rowntree Foundation has suggested replacing the current Council tax system based on bands of house prices with a system that would mean the tax was more closely related to property prices. This would increase taxes on the highest-priced properties and decrease them for the lowest. They claim it would also have the effect of reducing house excessive price fluctuations over the short run.

Land value tax is suggested by some as a replacement for council tax; it would be based entirely on land (i.e. location) value and not on the value of buildings built on a piece of land or improvements made.

=== International investment demand ===
In 2015, the Bow Group, a conservative think-tank, produced a report suggesting a reduction in international investment demand of property. The report proposed limiting foreign residents to the purchase of single new-build properties, with penalties if sold within five years. In 2016, London mayor Sadiq Khan launched an inquiry into housing costs in the city, also highlighting the effect of foreign investment.

=== Second home ownership ===
The government set up a £60 million fund to help councils deal with high levels of second home ownership. In 2016, a referendum in St Ives, Cornwall found 83.2% of voters in favour of new housing projects being reserved for full-time residents, as many tourists frequent the area and Cornwall is popular for second home and holiday property ownership.

=== Buy-to-let tax changes ===
From April 2016, a stamp duty surcharge of three per cent of the purchase price was required for those buying to let. From April 2017, buy-to-let mortgage interest payments will have higher rates of income tax relief phased out by the government. Although, companies would not be affected by the new rules.

== Rented homes ==
The English Housing Survey Bulletin 13 states that in 2013/14 there were 4.4 million households in the private rented sector and 3.9 million households in the social rented sector, of whom 2.3 million households (10%) were renting from a housing association and 1.6 million (7%) were renting from a local authority. Private renters had the highest weekly housing costs, paying on average £176 per week in rent. Mortgagors paid an average of £153 per week in mortgage payments while mean weekly rents in the social housing sector were £98 for housing association tenants and £89 for local authority tenants. When considering the gross weekly income, including benefits, of all household members, the proportion of income spent on housing costs was 18% for mortgagors, 29% for social renters, and 34% for private renters.

== London ==
The demand for more affordable housing has often been higher in London than in the rest of the UK. Research from Trust for London found that 24% of new housing completions in the three years to 2015/16 were affordable, which represented 21,500 homes. 6,700 affordable homes were completed in 2015/16, which is just 39% of the target set in the 2015 London Plan. They also found that the amount of affordable homes being built varies significantly between the London Boroughs. Tower Hamlets delivered 1830 affordable homes in the three years to 2015/16, the most in London, while Bexley only delivered 7, the fewest in London. Affordable housing is defined as housing that costs no more than 80% of the average local market rent.

== See also ==
- Affordable housing by country
- Homelessness in the United Kingdom
- Gazumping
- Green belt (United Kingdom)
- Housing in the United Kingdom
- Great Recession
- Help to Buy
- List of entities involved in 2007–2008 financial crises
- National Approved Letting Scheme
- Real estate economics
- Subprime mortgage crisis
