= Nestoria =

Search engine for real estate

- Company type: Private
- Website type: Search engine
- Available in: English, French, German, Italian, Spanish, Portuguese
- Founded: April 2006
- Headquarters: Clerkenwell, London, UK
- Key people: Javier Etxebeste (co-founder), Ed Freyfogle (co-founder)
- Industry: Real estate
- Parent: Lokku Ltd.
- Website: nestoria.us also nestoria.com.au / .com.br / .de / .es / .fr / .in / .it / .mx / .co.uk
- Launched: June 2006
- Current status: Active

Nestoria is a vertical search engine for real estate. In terms of users, Nestoria is the 5th largest property web site in the UK (February 2012) and the 9th in Spain (comScore, May 2009).

== Overview ==
Nestoria aggregates real estate listings from property portals and provides location-based search to Internet users. Results can be sorted by relevance, freshness, distance and type of property.

== Company ==
Javier Etxebeste and Ed Freyfogle, two former Yahoo! executives, founded Lokku Limited in April 2006. Lokku is based in Clerkenwell, London, UK. It is equity backed by private investors from UK and Spain. The first website brand Nestoria UK launched in June 2006, the Spanish website Nestoria España in May 2007, Nestoria Italia and Nestoria Deutschland in summer 2008. In March 2010 the company launched Nestoria Australia, followed by Nestoria France in July, Nestoria Brasil in November 2010 and Nestoria India in February 2011.

== Websites ==
Nestoria is a case study of Google Maps API use and of the Yahoo! User Interface library. As a web application hybrid or mashup, Nestoria geo-locates properties on maps and combines them with Point of Interest of transport, schools, hospitals and other local information relevant to homes seekers.

Nestoria, as a typical Web 2.0 operation, co-operates with collaborative projects such as OpenStreetMap (open source mapping) or Geograph British Isles (photographs). It shares its property data via a web service with webmasters or through co-branded property search such as media outlets like The Daily Telegraph, Capital, NWN Media and Channel 4 Homes (TV-station). Other Web 2.0 feature include widgets and a Facebook application. The company operates blogs in all the languages it operates in, and regularly interviews thought-leaders from the realm of internet technology and new media businesses.

In January 2010 Nestoria won Yahoo!'s UK Application Platform Competition

== Criticism ==
As with other search engines, Nestoria's search index is as updated and accurate as the data obtained from its sources (property portals and websites), which in turn are fed from estate agents' data. The quality of the search results (e.g. if a house is still on the market or already sold) strongly depends on the motivation of local estate agents to upload accurate information and to update them regularly.

In Spain, Brazil, France and Italy, the real estate market is based on non-exclusive contracts between property sellers and estate agents. Estate agents try not to disclose the precise location of the homes on the Internet. This prevents Nestoria from geocoding many properties accurately on a map.

== See also ==
- Property portal
- Zoopla
- Commercial People
- Rightmove
- Nuroa
