= REA Group =

Australian real estate company

REA Group Limited
- Type: Public
- Traded as: ASX: REA; S&P/ASX 200 component
- Founded: 1995; 31 years ago
- Headquarters: 511 Church Street, Richmond, Victoria, Australia
- Key people: Cameron McIntyre (CEO); Tracey Fellows (former CEO)
- Products: Real estate advertising
- Revenue: ▲ A$928 million (2021)
- Owner: News Corp Australia (majority)
- Website: rea-group.com

REA Group Ltd and its subsidiaries, collectively known as the REA Group, form a global online real estate advertising company. REA Group is headquartered in Melbourne, Australia, with a subsidiary office in Gurugram, India.

REA Group, founded in 1995, is a publicly listed company on the Australian Securities Exchange (ASX: REA) and is majority-owned by News Corp Australia.

== History ==
Simon Baker was chief executive of REA Group from 2001 to 2008. By 2004, News Corp owned 44-per cent of the company. Baker was "dumped" according to The Sydney Morning Herald.

REA Group grew from realestate.com.au, Australia's largest property website with 4.4 million unique browsers each month. However, the company's strategy has been to aggressively expand internationally through acquisition.

In 2007, REA Group acquired 59% of casa.it in Italy, which was increased to 70% the year after, before acquiring 100% in 2011. That same year in February 2007, REA Group acquired atHome, a group of real estate websites in Luxembourg, France, Germany and Belgium.

UK Property Shop was acquired by REA Group in July 2008.

In August 2009, Zoopla acquired the PropertyFinder Group, with combined annual revenues of £7 million, from prior owners the REA Group and News International for an undisclosed sum.

In 2010, the company created an iOS mobile application for realestate.com.au.

REA bought 20% of US company Move, inc. in 2014, which runs the United States real estate listings website Realtor.com. This was the company's first move into North America.

In July 2015, realestate.com.au announced a new agreement with Inspect Real Estate (IRE) making booking rental inspections easier for property managers and Australians looking to rent a home by implementing IRE's RegisterOnline property inspection booking button.

In 2016, the company acquired flatmates.com.au, as well as launching realestate.com.au, a virtual property app on Google Daydream.

In January 2017, REA Group acquired 14.7% of digital real estate marketing platform, Elara Technologies (Elara).

In June 2018, the company acquired 100% of Hometrack Australia, a provider of property data services to the financial sector.

In 2020, the company earned A$820.3 million in FY20 revenue. The company had over 2,600 employees and over 20 brands owned and invested in across eight countries.

In June 2021, REA Group acquired a 34% interest in Simpology. The company offers lodgment and digital mortgage application solutions for broking and lending industries.

In September 2024, REA Group announced it was considering a cash and share takeover bid for Rightmove. The news caused Rightmove's shares to surge by 25%, raising its market value to £5.4 billion. No formal takeover offer was made. Analysts noted that REA's interest in Rightmove seemed more financial than strategic, though the acquisition could have offered valuable strategic insights and opportunities in mortgages and commercial property.

== REA South Asia ==
REA Group Asia
- Formerly: iProperty Group Limited
- Type: Private
- Industry: Digital
- Founded: 2007; 19 years ago
- Area served: Asia (Malaysia, Thailand, Singapore, Hong Kong, Indonesia, India)
- Key people: Henry Ruiz (CEO - REA Group Asia); Owen Wilson (CEO - REA Group)

The company announced on 11 September, 2007, that it had made its first acquisition in Asia, with the purchase of Hong Kong's largest English-language property magazine, SquareFoot.

In 2011, REA partnered with Thoughtworks, thereby expanding into Greater China. Daniel Aragao, former lead architect at REA Group said of the collaboration in 2020, "The ThoughtWorks Technology Radar allows us to compare our expectations with someone who's a thought leader in the industry and has an unbiased opinion. So it helps us to guide our decisions and what we're going to be adopting next."

In 2013, the company launched myfun.com, continuing their Asia focus.

In 2016, REA Group Asia purchased iProperty Group and Brickz.my, both based in Malaysia. The company also purchased thinkofliving and Prakard.com in Thailand. REA Group has three offices in Asia: in Bangkok, Hong Kong and Kuala Lumpur.

In 2018, the company invested in India's Elara Technologies, the parent company of Housing.com, Makaan.com and PropTiger, before acquiring a controlling stake in Elara in 2020.

In May 2021, REA Group merged their Southeast Asian assets with PropertyGuru, after years of battling with rivals for market dominance. The property sites concerned are situated in Malaysia and Thailand and will be transferred in exchange for an 18% stake in the company and a seat on the board.

== Community action ==
In 2014, REA Group launched a partnership with Launch Housing, an organisation tackling homelessness based in Melbourne. The partnership funds support for women and children at risk of experiencing homelessness as a result of family violence. Investments include supporting Launch Housing's social enterprise HomeGround Real Estate, to providing skilled volunteers, to building IKEA furniture for families in need via the REA employee induction program.
