= NALS =

Nals is a municipality in northern Italy.

NALS may refer to:

- Native American Literature Symposium
- National Approved Letting Scheme
- National Association of Legal Professionals (formerly National Association of Legal Secretaries - kept acronym)
- Neonatal Advanced Life Support
- North American Leaders' Summit
- North American Lutheran Seminary
