= PrimeLocation =

British real estate website

- Type: Division
- Industry: Real estate
- Founded: 2001; 25 years ago
- Headquarters: London, United Kingdom
- Owner: ZPG Ltd
- Parent: Zoopla
- Website: www.primelocation.com

PrimeLocation.com is a UK property portal owned by ZPG Ltd that lists properties in the UK and abroad. It was founded in 2001 by a group of 200 UK estate agents. It accepts property listings only from estate agents, letting agents and property developers. Its main rival is Rightmove.

== Overview ==
PrimeLocation primarily addresses the upper and middle property markets. The website lists properties from over 16,000 estate agent branches, including high-end estate agents such as Knight Frank, Hamptons International and Strutt & Parker.

Primelocation.com attracts over 5 million visitors a month. It also lists overseas properties from over 60 countries. In April 2010 there were 2.3 million unique visitors to the site.

== Blog Awards ==
In December 2009, Primelocation.com launched a property blog awards to recognise the talent of property bloggers. Nominations were accepted in four categories: best blog, best blog post, best newcomer and users' favourite. Winners of "the users' favourite" category were determined by a public vote, whereas the remaining three winners were chosen by judges.

== Acquisition ==
In January 2006, Primelocation.com was purchased for £48m by the Daily Mail and General Trust and was part of the property portfolio of Associated Northcliffe Digital, the group's digital consumer division alongside FindaProperty.com. In 2011, DMGT merged its Digital Property Group with Zoopla, aiming to challenge Rightmove. DMGT owns 55% of the new company.

In June 2016, Zoopla Property Group (ZPG) announced that it was planning to relaunch Primelocation. The objective was for Primelocation to appear more contemporary, with differentiation for area sponsorship and premium listings.

== See also ==
- Zoopla
