= UK Property Shop =

UK Property Shop Ltd
- Type: Subsidiary
- Industry: Internet, real estate
- Founded: 1999
- Defunct: 2009
- Fate: Acquired
- Successor: Zoopla
- Headquarters: London, United Kingdom
- Area served: United Kingdom
- Services: online real estate and lettings agents
- Parent: Zoopla
- Website: www.ukpropertyshop.co.uk

UK Property Shop was a British company that publishes an online directory of UK estate agents and letting agents known as The National Directory of Estate Agents. It was acquired by Zoopla in 2009 and was merged with the Zoopla service.

== History ==
UK Property Shop Ltd was registered as a limited company in 1999. Its official registered office address was 2nd Floor, Union House, 182–194 Union Street, London, SE1 0LH and the company registration number was 3804008.

UK Property Shop Ltd was acquired by REA Group in July 2008. In August 2009, Zoopla acquired the PropertyFinders Group, consisting of the websites Propertyfinders.com, Hotproperty.co.uk and Ukpropertyshop.co.uk, with combined annual revenues of £7M, from prior owners the REA Group and News International for an undisclosed sum.

== Operations ==
The National Directory of Estate Agents was a searchable database of estate agents and letting agents dealing with residential property in the UK. All agents were provided with a basic entry free of charge, but could pay to have their office promoted and for extra services. Individuals selling property privately (i.e. directly without an agent), as well as 'virtual' agents without a local business address, were prohibited from being listed in the directory. Access was free for viewers, who were capable of both finding estate agents in any location and linking to each agent's own website, as well as requesting information from estate agents about properties for sale or to rent.

In December 2007 the directory held details of about 18,300 offices of estate agents and letting agents. Of this total, just over 15,000 offices were dealing with property sales, 10,000 with residential lettings and around 1,300 with student rentals. There were just over 7,000 offices dealing with both sales and lettings, almost 8,000 offices dealing with sales only, around 3,200 dealing with lettings only and just 65 offices dealing exclusively with student rentals.

UK Property Shop also publishes a monthly 'Moving Location Index' report that ranked towns according to the proportion of people wishing to move into or away from that location.
