= Geograph Ireland =

- Website type: Photography website
- Available in: English
- Owner: Geograph Project Limited
- Website: http://www.geograph.ie/
- Commercial: No
- Registration: Required for contributing photos
- Users: 11,992 users contributors (including Great Britain and Northern Ireland)
- Launched: 25 October 2010 (15 years ago)
- Current status: Active
- Content license: CC-BY-SA

Geograph Ireland is a web-based project, initiated in 2010, to create a freely accessible archive of geographically located photographs of the Republic of Ireland. It is a sister project to Geograph (launched in March 2005), which also includes Northern Ireland.

Photographs in the Geograph collection are chosen to illustrate significant or typical features of each 1 km × 1 km (100 ha) grid square in the Ordnance Survey National Grid (of Great Britain and Northern Ireland) and the Irish national grid reference system. There are 331,920 such grid squares containing at least some land (at low tide). Each page uses a Geo microformat.

Geographs are being collected for all parts of Great Britain and Ireland. The Channel Islands fall outside Britain's grid system, but may be Geographed using their local UTM grid for another sister project, Geograph Channel Islands.

The main Geograph project is sponsored by Ordnance Survey, and extracts from the OS Landranger 1:50,000 scale maps illustrate the grid square pages.

Geograph Project Limited, is a Charity Registered in England and Wales, and the name Geograph is trademarked.

== Contributions ==
Photographs can be contributed by any registered user, although they must be approved by a panel of moderators before appearing on the website. The main aim of moderation is to make the site 'classroom ready' so that inappropriate images are rejected. The activity of taking photographs for the project is known as geographing. All images are licensed by the contributors using the Creative Commons cc-by-sa 2.0 licence which permits modification and redistribution of the images under certain conditions. Contributors should be aware that they are granting everyone an irrevocable licence to use their image(s); it is very difficult to get an image removed once it appears on the website. Photo resolution is a minimum of 640 by 480 pixels, with options for higher resolutions.

The entire archive of images with RDF metadata is being made available for download via BitTorrent.

As an incentive to increase coverage, participants are awarded a point each time they contribute the first photograph classified as a geograph to a grid square. There is, however, no limit to the number of images per square, and some squares have over 1000 images.

Some participants combine geographing with other outdoor location sports such as letterboxing, geocaching, trigpointing, benchmarking, and peak bagging.

== Types of image ==
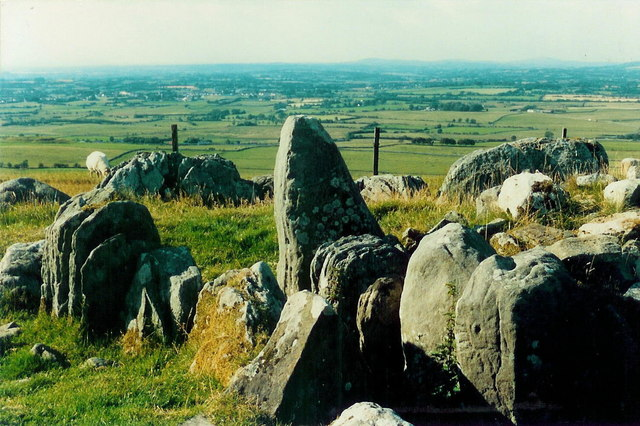
Typical rural geograph image (by Kieran Campbell)

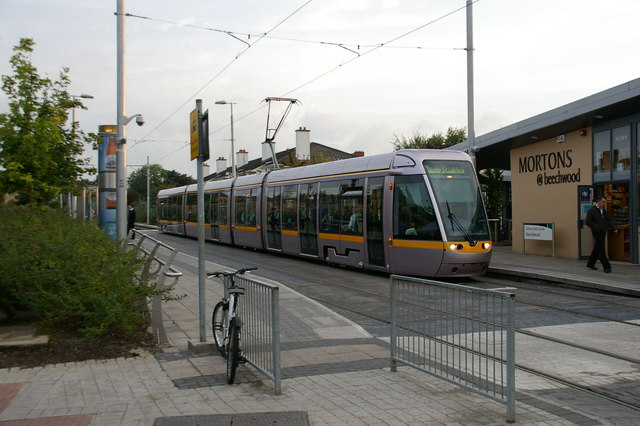
Typical urban geograph image (by Alex P. Knapp)

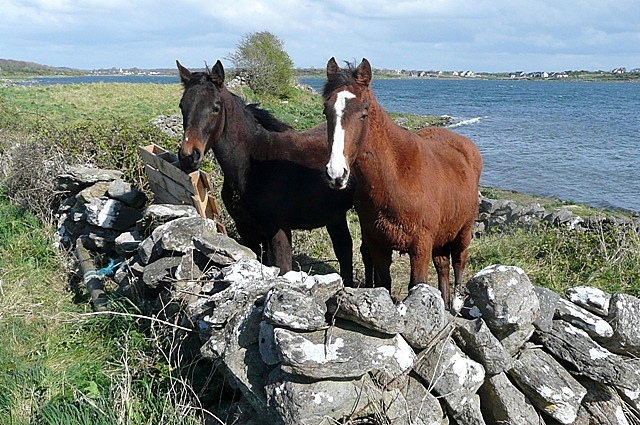
Typical wildlife geograph image (by Graham Horn)

Geograph images are classified by site moderators as:

- Geograph – an image which usefully illustrates or characterises the area in which it was taken;
- Supplemental – an image which adds useful information about a square but which does not meet the requirements of a geograph; this includes close-ups, interior, underground and aerial shots, and shots taken from outside the grid square;
- Rejected – an image that does not meet the requirements of the Geograph Project; these are retained by the system but are not visible to anyone other than the owner and the moderators.

There is a special classification of image that is known as First Geograph – the first image uploaded of a particular grid square which meets the requirements to be a geograph; this status is assigned automatically by the system and not by moderators. A new system of points where contributors can gain Second, Third and Fourth points has now been introduced. Similar to the first point system, this time a contributor with gain a point depending on how many other geographers have submitted to that square. For example, a square with one image by one contributor will have second, third and fourth points up for grabs. The same will apply if the first contributor has submitted 100 images in that square. The date the photo was taken makes no difference to the points system. So the next person to submit a geograph will gain a second visit point. The third person to submit will get a third and so on. This was introduced with feedback from members as well as a need to fill up squares will few images.

Some of the common themes for geograph photos include:

- Physical landscape
- Human land use
- Built environment
- Social interaction
- Geology
- Flora and fauna
- Local history

== Statistics ==
As of 5 February 2014, the main project had over 3.8million photographs contributed by almost 12,000 contributors, covering 96% of Great Britain and 39% of Ireland. On the Geograph Ireland site, 14,878 images were contributed.
