= Nuroa =

- Website type: Search engine
- Available in: Spanish, Italian, Portuguese, French, German and English
- Creators: Oriol Blasco; Gary Stewart
- Website: www.nuroa.co.uk

Nuroa is a vertical real estate search engine that displays real estate offers available on the internet for rental, sale and sharing of property including holiday rentals.

== History ==
Nuora was founded by Oriol Blasco and Gary Stewart in 2006. In August 2007, the project was presented at the Essential Web 2007 conference in London.

Between September 2007 and 2009, Nuroa launched in several new markets including;

- Spain, winning Red Herring Europe Award.
- Germany
- In 2009, Nuroa expanded globally, reaching 15 countries, adding Italy, Portugal, France, Austria, Switzerland, United Kingdom, Ireland, Mexico, Chile, Brasil, Argentina, Australia, and the United States.
- In 2016, Nuroa was acquired by Mitula Group, a classifieds vertical search, when was operating in United Kingdom, Germany, Austria, France, Italy, Ireland, Switzerland, the United States, Argentina, Brazil, Mexico, Chile, Australia, Peru, Colombia, Spain and Portugal.
- In 2019 became part of Lifull Connect after the acquisition of Mitula Group by Lifull
- In 2022 Nuroa operates in 26 countries, adding United Emirates, South Africa, Ecuador, Venezuela, Morocco, Malaysia, Peru, Philippines, Pakistan and India to already existing markets

== Data ==
- 30 million ads - October 2014
- 2 million users - September 2014
- 15 countries - October 2014
- 3 main products : Sale-Rent-Share-Holiday rentals

== Criticism ==
The results depend on the accuracy of the original listings, which are often poorly maintained or out of date, yet are still being displayed.

== See also ==
- Property portal
- Zoopla
- Nestoria
- Rightmove
