= National Resource Directory =

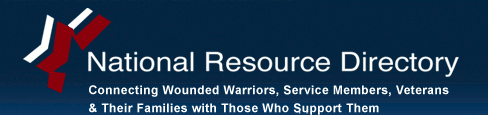
- Formation: 2008
- Type: Government Web Portal
- Purpose: Connecting Wounded Warriors, Service Members, Veterans and their families with those who support them.
- Affiliations: U.S. Department of Defense, U.S. Department of Labor and U.S. Department of Veterans Affairs
- Website: nrd.gov

The National Resource Directory (NRD) is a United States Government inter-agency web portal for Wounded Warriors, Service Members, Veterans, their families and caregivers. It provides information and links to thousand of national, state and local resources. The NRD was established to support the reintegration, recovery and rehabilitation of members of the United States Armed Forces. According to Assistant Secretary of Labor for Disability Employment Policy, Kathleen Martinez, "the National Resource Directory is part of our commitment to ensuring they have access to the resources they need to recover and successfully return to work and civilian life."

Visitors to the web portal can find information about Veterans' benefits, including disability and pension benefits, VA health care and educational opportunities, homeless assistance and employment resources. The site also provides information for those who care for Veterans, such as access to emotional, financial and community assistance.

Its directory contains over 16,000 vetted and organized resources and the links include federal, state and local government agencies, Veterans service organizations, non-profit and community-based organizations, and academic institutions and professional associations.

The National Resource Directory is a collaborative effort between the U.S. Department of Defense, U.S. Department of Labor and U.S. Department of Veterans Affairs.

The NRD website was redesigned in April 2010 to include Bookmark & Share capabilities, as well as updates for the search engine. In 2011, a mobile version of the NRD website was released for ease of use on mobile phones. The link is available on the homepage for users to be able to select it to use on smaller screens.

In November 2016 the NRD was relaunched under the supervision of the Department of Defence (DoD). The management team reviewed over 3,000 sites listed of non-governmental organizations, programs and resources. The new website was designed with software updates to increase the ability of the management team to make changes faster as well as to make it more user-friendly with the addition of widgets.

The NRD is responsible for the Defense Health Agency’s electronic Caregiver Resource Directory (eCRD). When the NRD is updated with new resources they are also added directly to the eCRD.
