= Wowcher =

British deal-of-the-day site

Wowcher Limited
- Industry: Electronic commerce
- Founded: 2009
- Founder: Nicholas Brummitt
- Services: Activities and experiences; Beauty products and treatments; Clothing; Dining; Electronics; Fitness products; Garden products; Gifts; Home products; Mystery Deals; Spa packages; Travel and holidays
- Subsidiaries: Living Social; 5pm
- Website: wowcher.co.uk

Wowcher is the second largest British e-commerce deal of the day site in the United Kingdom and Ireland. Wowcher offers daily deals and discounted vouchers from merchants offering a variety of products and services including dining, travel, local experiences, consumer goods, electronics and beauty treatments.

The company currently operates under the brands Wowcher, LivingSocial, and 5pm, and serves over 24 million opted-in subscribers across the UK and Ireland.

== History ==
Founded in 2009 by Nicholas Brummitt and bought in 2011 by DMG Media, the business was acquired by DMG Media, owner of the Daily Mail in 2011. DMG then sold a majority stake of Wowcher to Exponent Private Equity for £29 million in 2015, retaining a 30% minority share.

In 2025, Wowcher acquired the Glasgow-based deals website 5pm, expanding its presence in Scotland.

== Services ==
Wowcher sells over 250,000 spa packages each year, introducing 180,000 new clients to spas annually, equating to £18 million in revenue for the spa industry.

In 2019, Wowcher integrated a ‘choose your flights’ system to holiday deals to improve the booking experience for customers. This allowed customers to choose their flight times and dates when booking, rather than through the merchant.

Wowcher launched an expanded hotel booking channel in partnership with SiteMinder in 2023, allowing independent hotels to reach Wowcher’s audience directly and manage their inventory through automated integrations.

== Awards ==
Wowcher reached the finals of the eCommerce Awards for Excellence 2014 in the category ‘Best eCommerce Customer Service’. The company was nominated due to its adoption of ContactWorld for Service, a cloud based solution designed to improve customer service experiences.

== See also ==
- Groupalia
