= Disability.gov =

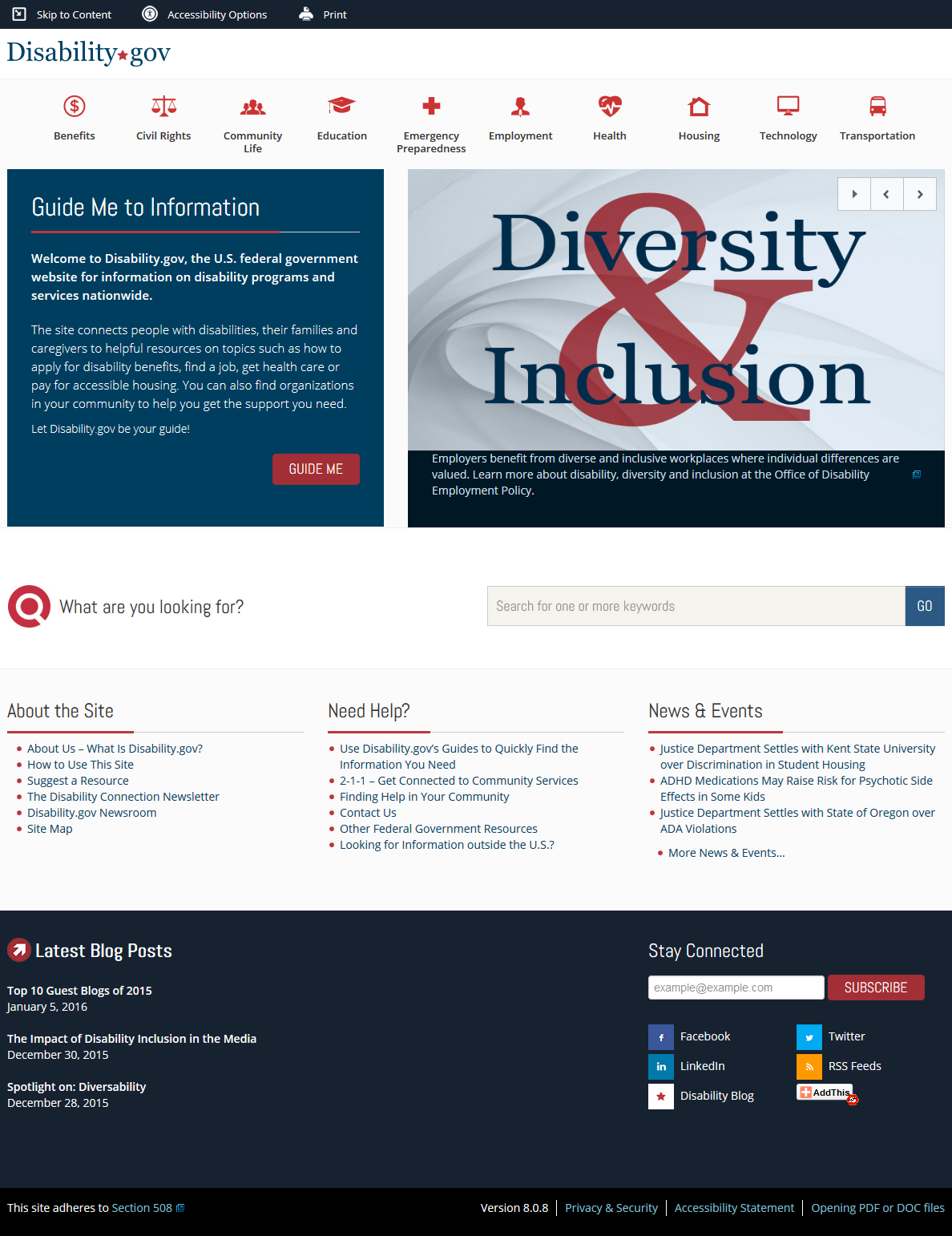
- Disability.gov as it appeared on January 5, 2016
- Owner: Federal government of the United States
- Website: disability.gov
- Commercial: No
- Launched: 16 October 2002; 24 years ago

Disability.gov was a United States Government inter-agency web portal that provided access to comprehensive information about disability-related programs and services from 2002 to 2016. The site contained thousands of trusted resources, updated daily, from the federal government, educational institutions, non-profit organizations and state and local governments.

Disability.gov offered information for the more than 50 million Americans with disabilities. It was also a reliable resource for parents of children with disabilities, employers, workforce and human resource professionals, veterans, military families, caregivers and other community members. The site offered resources on ten key subjects: benefits, civil rights, community life, education, emergency preparedness, employment, health, housing, technology and transportation.

== History ==
Originally launched in 2002 as DisabilityInfo.gov, the site was created by the head of disabled employment, Roy Grizzard, following an Executive Directive made in August 2002 by President George W. Bush as part of his New Freedom Initiative, and was launched by United States Secretary of Labor Elaine Chao in October 2002.

The portal reached the one million visitor mark and over 20 million 'hits' by June 2003. It subsequently won a number of awards: the Web Content Managers Best Practice Peer Award; the American Association of Webmasters (AAWM) 2006 Gold Award for outstanding design and quality of content; and the e-gov Institute's Knowledge Management Award for "delivering high value to citizens in a knowledge management solution."

The site was relaunched as Disability.gov on July 27, 2009. The redesigned site is easy to navigate and includes social media tools to encourage visitor interaction and feedback. Visitors can sign up for personalized news and updates, participate in online discussion and suggest resources for the site.

Disability.gov and its associated social media accounts were sunset in December 2016 and are no longer available. Disability.gov currently redirects to a page of disability related-resources available from the U.S. Department of Labor's Office of Disability Employment Policy (ODEP). Federal resources on disability and employment can be found on the website of the Campaign for Disability Employment (CDE) at https://www.whatcanyoudocampaign.org/index.php.
