= Letting agent =

Sales occupation

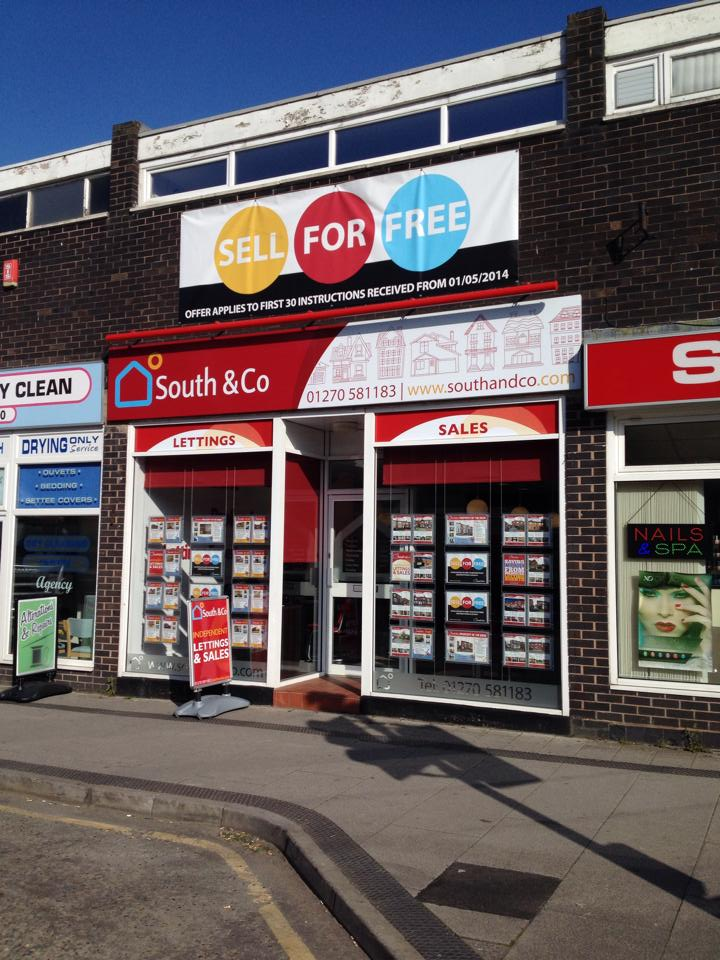
Letting Agent Building in Crewe

A letting agent is a facilitator through which an agreement is made between a landlord and tenant to rent a residential property. This is commonly used in countries using British English, including countries of the Commonwealth. In the UK, Australia, and New Zealand, the agreement between landlord and tenant is normally formalised by the signing of a tenancy agreement. A letting agency normally charges a commission for their services, usually a percentage of the monthly rent.

Letting agents will often operate under the umbrella of an Estate Agent due to the synergies that exist between the two professions. Still, there are many agents that deal exclusively with lettings.

Although there are two main types of renting, letting agents deal primarily with tenancies between private tenants and landlords.

== Services and fees ==
There are a number of services offered by lettings agents, including:

- Tenant Find Service - Finding a tenant for a landlord's property. The cost can vary depending on the agent and is usually charged up-front and expensed to the landlord.
- Tenant Screening and Referencing - This can include referencing (credit searches, previous landlord referencing, employment referencing), drawing up a tenancy agreement.
- Inventory/Check In - conducting a check-in, drawing up a schedule of condition/inventory documenting the condition of the property before the tenancy starts. Tenants would agree on the condition documented in the tenancy as a true representation of the property.
- Rent Collection - Many agents will offer to collect the rent from a tenant for an additional commission. This cost can vary, but is usually less than 5%.
- Full Management - This is the day-to-day management of a rental property. Many agents will provide this service for landlords who wish to have a hands off approach to their investment. This service can cost between 7% and 20.0%. This typically includes:
  - Maintenance - The letting agent will organise maintenance requirements of the property, including sourcing multiple quotations from contractors and instructing maintenance.
  - Market Appraisal - perform an analysis on the local market, including the markets conditions, such as demand, to calculate a rental value of the property. Rental values are usually priced as PCM (Per Calendar Month).
  - Licensing & Certification - Ensure the property is compliant with gas safety legislation, energy efficiency (EPC), electrical safety legislation, legionella testing and recently landlord licensing in areas such as Liverpool.
  - Account Management - receiving rental payments and managing the landlords property account financially. This includes paying contractors and other third parties. Generally, the landlord will receive rental income minus deductions once per month.
  - Property Inspections - conducting inspections of the property to ensure it is being kept and treated in accordance with the tenancy agreement.
  - Rent Reviews - annually review the rental value to ensure correct market value - this can mean the rent is increased or decreased.
  - Marketing - letting agents generally advertise via their website, although mostly through large property portals like Zoopla and Rightmove in which they pay a monthly fee.

Typical letting agent fees to tenants in England and Wales may include:

- Inventory fee - To cover the costs of inspecting the property and drawing up an inventory. This is usually conducted at the start of a tenancy. It is no longer common practice for the tenant to be charged a fee for the inventory.
- Tenancy extension/renewal fee - A renewal fee can be charged if the tenant extends their tenancy beyond the initial term. Renewal fees can vary in cost but tend to be at lower rate than the original referencing fee
- Exit fee - Similar to the inventory fee to cover the cost of a final inspection of the property to compare its condition to that at the start of the tenancy.

The chancellor, Philip Hammond, promised to ban letting agent fees in England and Wales in his autumn statement of November 2016. Such fees have been made illegal in Scotland and tenants may reclaim any fees paid through the courts. The majority of lettings agents in England do not charge tenants fees.

To maximise the service that a letting agent provides it is important prospective tenants to make letting agents aware of their requirements before they arrange viewings so that properties are better matched to tenant's needs. Since letting agents act as a matchmaker between property, landlord and tenant it is important for them to gain an understanding of customer requirements including; location, property size, budget, pets, etc.

== Regulation ==
There are currently no statutory arrangements regarding the regulation of letting agents. Around half of UK lettings agents are currently self-regulated. The principal organisations for lettings agents are the Association of Residential Letting Agents (ARLA) and the Royal Institution of Chartered Surveyors (RICS). These have codes of practice and compliance controls which govern the activities of their members.

The English government also provides its own accrediting body for letting agents. This body is called NALS (National Assured Letting Scheme).

In Scotland all landlords must be registered with the local authority. Whilst agents are not required to register, they are actively encouraged to do so. Scotland's rental market is more tightly regulated than anywhere else in the UK. New rules came into force in December 2017 that introduced a raft of changes designed to protect both landlords and tenants, but negotiating the regulations has caused a headache for some property owners.

== See also ==
- National Approved Letting Scheme
