= Geograph Britain and Ireland =

Archive of geographically located images in the United Kingdom and Ireland

- Company type: Registered charity in England and Wales
- Website type: Photography and educational website
- Available in: English
- Headquarters: Dept 1706, 43 Owston Road, Carcroft, Doncaster, South Yorkshire. DN6 8DA
- Country of origin: United Kingdom
- Area served: United Kingdom and Ireland
- Owner: Geograph Project Limited
- Creator: Gary Rogers
- Website: www.geograph.org.uk
- Advertising: No
- Commercial: No
- Registration: Required for contributing photos
- Users: 13,449 contributors as of 29 November 2021
- Launched: 6 March 2005 (21 years ago)
- Current status: Active
- Content license: Creative Commons Attribution-ShareAlike 2.0 Generic
- Written in: PHP

The map browsing interface, showing thumbnail photos for each completed "geograph"

Geograph Britain and Ireland is a web-based project, begun in March 2005, to create a freely accessible archive of geographically located photographs of Great Britain and Ireland. Photographs in the Geograph collection are chosen to illustrate significant or typical features of each 1 km × 1 km (100 ha) grid square in the Ordnance Survey National Grid and the Irish national grid reference system. There are 332,099 such grid squares containing at least some land or permanent structure (at low tide), of which 282,000 have Geographs.

Geographs are being collected for all parts of Great Britain, Isle of Man and Ireland. The Channel Islands fall outside Britain's grid system, but may be geographed using their local UTM grid.

The project is sponsored by the Ordnance Survey, and extracts from the OS Landranger 1:50,000 scale maps illustrate the grid square pages. Geograph Project Limited is a charity registered in England and Wales, and the name Geograph is trademarked.

== Contributions ==
Photographs can be contributed by any registered user, although they must be approved by a panel of moderators before appearing on the website. The main aim of moderation is to make the site 'classroom ready' so that inappropriate images are rejected. All images are licensed by the contributors using the Creative Commons Attribution-ShareAlike 2.0 Generic which permits modification and redistribution of the images under certain conditions. Contributors should be aware that they are granting everyone an irrevocable licence to use their image(s); it is very difficult to get an image removed once it appears on the website. Default photo resolution is a 1024 pixels long edge, with a minimum of 640 pixels and options for higher resolutions to be made available.

The entire archive of images with RDF metadata is available for download via BitTorrent.

As an incentive to increase coverage, participants are awarded a point each time they contribute the first photograph classified as a geograph to a grid square. There is, however, no limit to the number of images per square, and some squares have over 1000 images.

Some participants combine geographing with other outdoor location sports such as letterboxing, geocaching, trigpointing, benchmarking, and peak bagging.

== Types of image ==
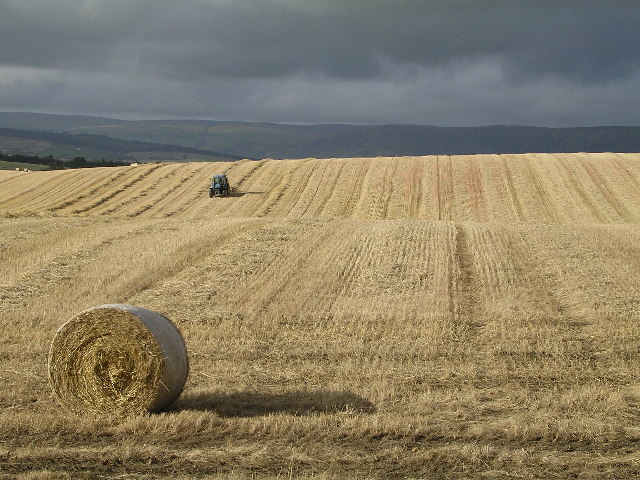
Typical rural geograph image

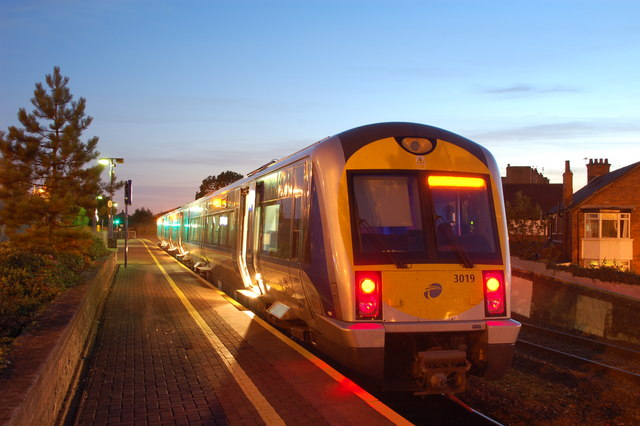
Typical urban geograph image

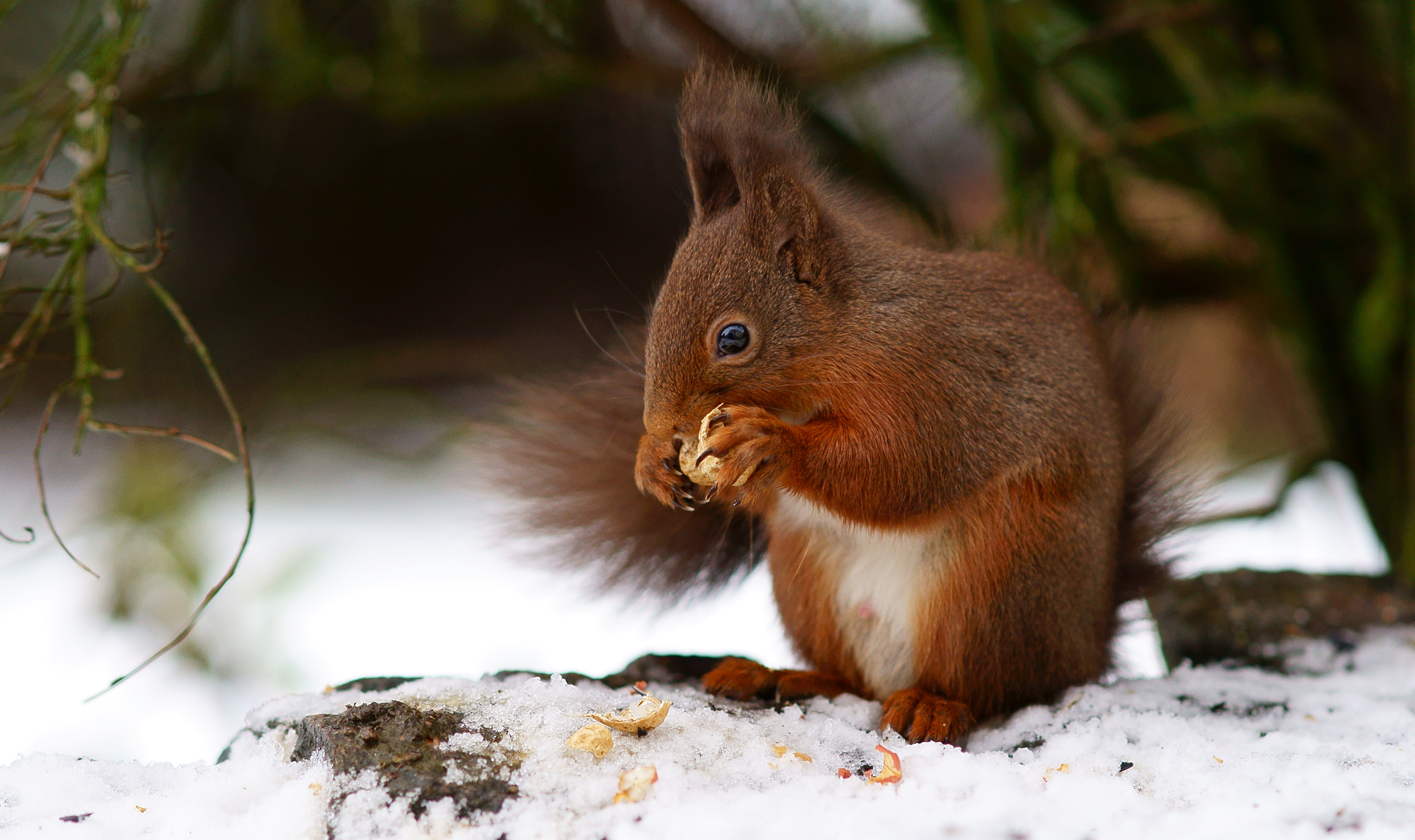
Typical wildlife supplemental image

Geograph images are classified by site moderators as:

- Geograph – an image which usefully illustrates or characterises the area in which it was taken;
- Accepted – an image which adds useful information about a square but which does not meet the requirements of a geograph; this includes close-ups, interiors, aerial shots, photos taken from outside the grid square, moveable objects that can't be shown on maps and silhouetted images; this category has subcategories 'Close Look', 'Inside', 'Aerial', 'Cross Grid' and 'Extra';
- Rejected – an image that does not meet the requirements of the Geograph Project.

There is a special classification of image that is known as a First Geograph – the first image uploaded of a particular grid square which meets the requirements to be a geograph. Contributors can also gain Second, Third and Fourth visitor points for each square, depending on how many other geographers have already submitted geographs to that square. The relevant date is when the photo was submitted, rather than taken.

A contributor gains a TPoint (Time-gap Point) by submitting a photo that was taken over five years after the most recent image for that square. A contributor can also gain a TPoint by submitting an historic photo to a square that was taken at least five years distant from any other photograph in the square.

The site also provides a count of the number of grid squares each contributor has photographed (Personal Points).

Some of the common themes for geograph photos include:

- Physical landscape
- Human land use
- Built environment
- Social interaction
- Geology
- Flora and fauna
- Local history

== Statistics ==
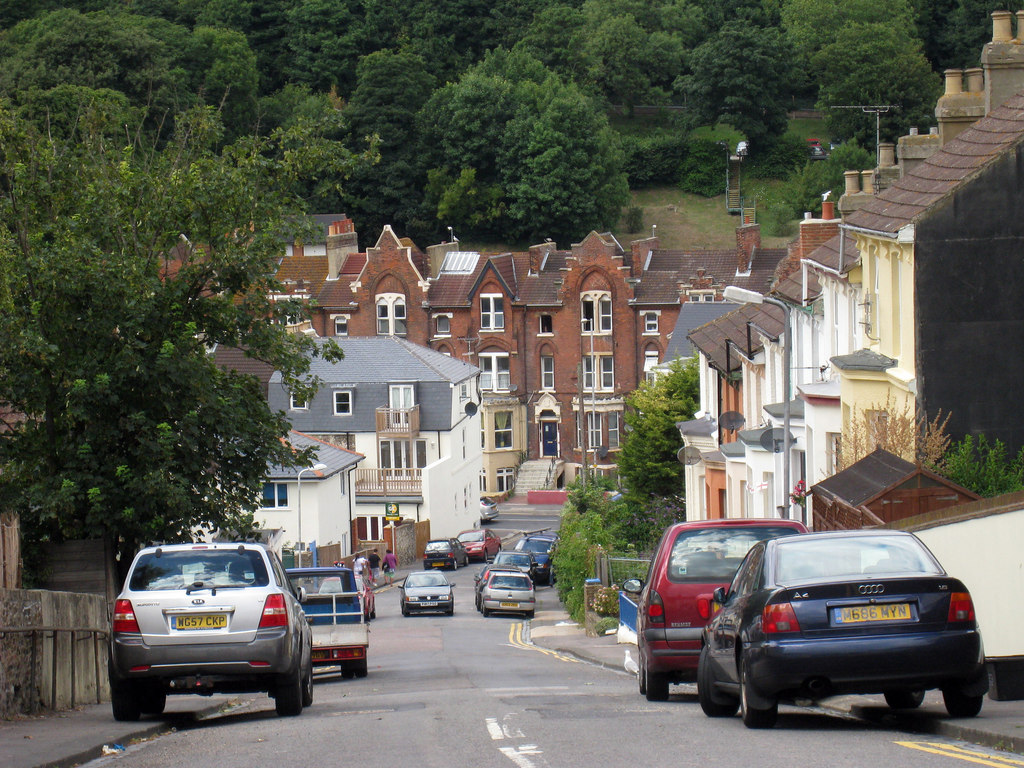
The 2,000,000th submitted image: Malvern Rise near Dover

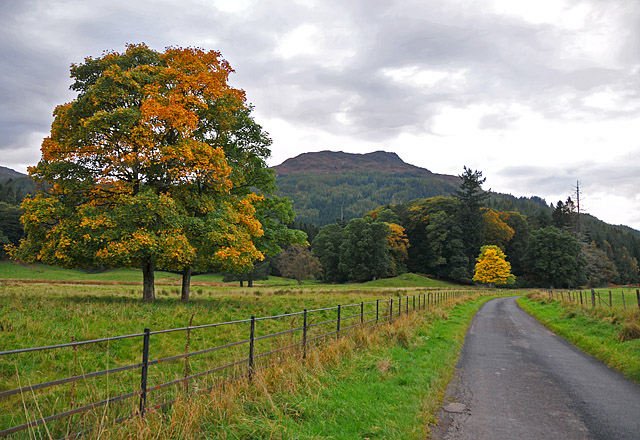
1,000,000th image shows a minor road near Aberuchill

As of March 2026, the project had over 8.2 million photographs from over 14,100 contributors, covering over 98% of Great Britain and over 48% of Ireland. There were an average of 29 images per grid square.

Milestones include:

- 19 March 2025: The 8 millionth image submitted
- 29 November 2021: The 7 millionth image was submitted
- 17 January 2019: The 6 millionth image was submitted
- 5 July 2016: The 5 millionth image was submitted
- 9 June 2014: The 4 millionth image was submitted
- August 2012: 80% coverage of Great Britain & Ireland
- 29 June 2012: The 3 millionth image was submitted
- 14 August 2010: The 2 millionth image was submitted
- 15 October 2008: Millionth image
- 8 April 2008: 750,000 images
- 13 March 2008: Two-thirds coverage of Great Britain & Ireland
- 25 July 2007: 500,000 images
- 25 June 2007: 75% coverage of Great Britain
- 30 May 2007: 10% coverage of Ireland
- 5 March 2007: 50% coverage of Great Britain & Ireland
- 3 October 2006: 250,000 images
- 17 August 2006: 50% coverage of Great Britain
- 1 March 2006: 25% coverage of Great Britain & Ireland
- 21 December 2005: 25% coverage of Great Britain

== Photograph of the Year competition ==
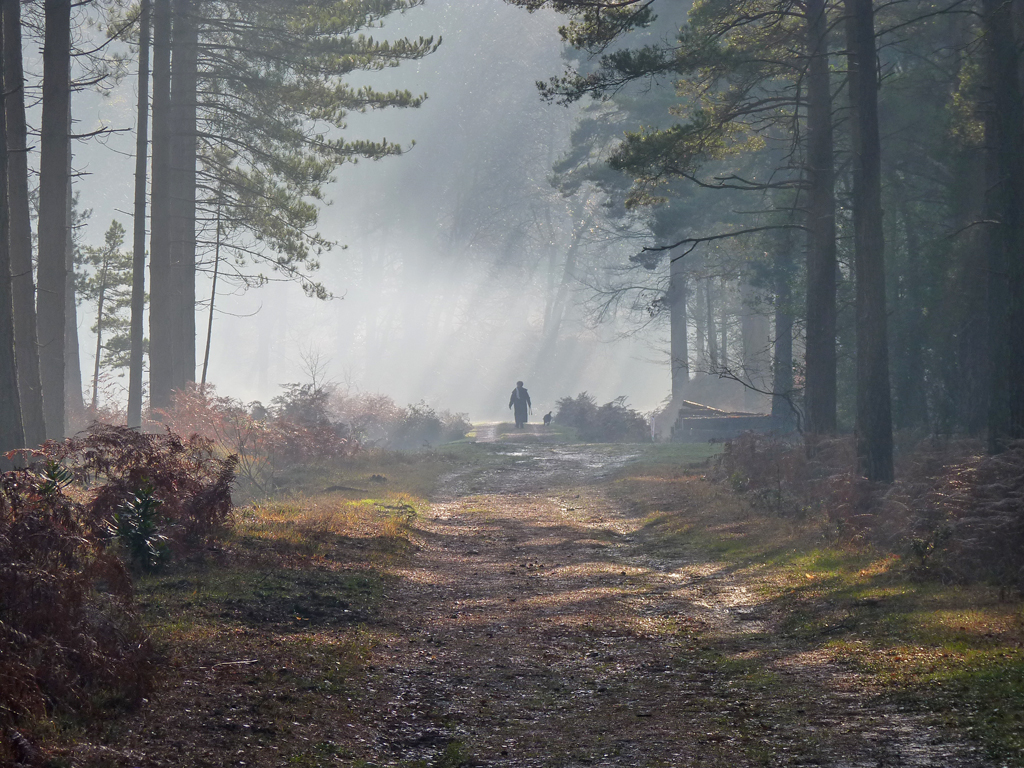
2011 winner by Mike Smith

A weekly competition runs in the members-only forums to select the Photograph of the Year (POTY) from photographs taken that week. Each week one of a panel of volunteer selectors chooses around 50 of the week's best photos. Last week's winner then picks their favourite photo from the 50. After the end of the year the weekly winners are voted on to decide the best photo of each month and overall winner.

The annual winners were:

- 2017 "Sheep on the Move" by Anne Burgess
- 2016 "November morning, Forest of Dean" by Jonathan Billinger
- 2015 "A537 Cat and Fiddle road from above Stake Farm" by Gary Rogers
- 2014 "North end of Mochrum Loch" by David Baird
- 2013 "Whiteout in Ninesprings" by Eugene Birchall
- 2012 "A slipway on Luing" by Walter Baxter
- 2011 "Morning Walk" by Mike Smith
- 2010 "The north ridge of Stob Ban" by Karl and Ali
- 2009 "Miners Hill" by Ian Slater
- 2008 "Deer Fence on the Shank of Drumfollow" by Gwen and James Anderson
- 2007 "Horsey Drainage Mill" by Rodney Burton
- 2006 "Islands of mud, East Hoyle Bank" by Peter Craine

== Awards ==
The Geograph site was awarded the Yahoo (UK & Ireland) Travel Find of the Year 2006.

UK Wikimedian of the Year 2012 – Honourable Mention

== Geograph Conference ==
On 17 February 2010, Geograph British Isles organised its first conference for contributors to the project. About 80 contributors attended to discuss the project in both plenary and break-out sessions. The event was hosted by Geograph's sponsor, Ordnance Survey. It took place at the Ordnance Survey head office at Romsey near Southampton and was reported by geography-related media.

On 4 April 2012 a second conference took place at The Circle in Sheffield. It took stock of where the project was at that time, as it neared 3 million submissions; and put forward potential solutions that could secure its financial future in the years ahead.

The third conference took place at The Edinburgh Training and Conference Venue on Saturday 8 June 2013. Subjects discussed included funding of the project, educational use of the images and the moderation procedures applied to contributors' submissions.

For the fourth conference, the venue was again Southampton, the Ordnance Survey's new headquarters building at Adanac Park, on 27 June 2014. Subjects discussed included the quality of submitted photographs and titles, the production of high-quality descriptions, local studies, as well as the funding of the project, educational use of the images and the moderation procedures applied to contributors' submissions as in 2013.

For the fifth conference, Geograph members gathered at Peterborough. On the Friday afternoon conference attendees visited a brickworks just outside the city. The conference itself was held at Peterborough Museum and included a talk on the geologist William Smith. Walks around the city centre and local waterways concluded the proceedings.

== Tools and facilities ==
The site has a number of tools for making use of the photographs. Collectively known as Collections, the site front page now features a Collection of the week. The various techniques include (with examples):

- Shared Descriptions, a simple method of grouping images by a common topic
- Articles, a longer text-and-image article by one or more authors
- Galleries, a forum-like mechanism where people list similar photos
- Geotrips, where photographs, a GPS track file, and a written description combine to illustrate a day out or an expedition.

Contributors can choose to add meta-data to each image, in the form of Subject and Tags, to go along with the geo-tagging by location. All of this allows the use of a Browser to allow the relatively large archive to be searched. There are other methods of search, of course, ranging from Simple text search to tagged searches and complex searches.

Because of the geographic indexing of the pictures, it is possible to summon a page for an individual 1-km square. These square pages all provide a /link page which links to internal and external tools, such as a wide range of other mapping sites, and the various national historical artefacts databases.

The site has a lot of detailed statistics, but can also create personal profile and personal coverage maps. It started as a game, and many of the tools support personal achievement and goals.

== Long term archival ==
The site's 7 million plus photographs were selected for long term web archiving by the British Library in their UK Web Archive.

Many photographs have been transferred to Wikimedia Commons, and the photos are used in thousands of Wikipedia articles. About 1.8 million photos were transferred to Commons in 2010/2011; nearly 10 years later, uploads were resumed and are ongoing.

== Sister projects ==
In 2009, a sister project, Geograph Deutschland was launched, covering Germany. Geograph Ireland currently co-exists with Geograph Britain and Ireland, but may split into a separate project. Geograph Channel Islands covers the Channel Islands.

== See also ==
- Degree Confluence Project
