= Oodle =

American online marketplace in San Mateo, California

- Oodle.com main page
- Company type: Division of QVC
- Website type: classifieds
- Available in: English
- Founded: 2004
- Headquarters: San Mateo, California, United States
- Owners: Oodle, Inc.
- Founders: Craig Donato; Scott Kister; Faith Sedlin
- Website: www.oodle.com
- Launched: 2005
- Current status: active

Oodle is an online marketplace based out of San Mateo, California. It was founded in 2004 by ex-Excite executives Craig Donato, Scott Kister and Faith Sedlin.

== Overview ==
Oodle is a classifieds aggregator which aggregates listings from sites like eBay, ForRent.com, BoatTrader.com, as well as local listings from local newspapers and websites.

Oodle encourages posters to add a Facebook profile with their listings, claiming that users will prefer the openness of interacting with someone who can be identified by name and face.

Oodle also powers other companies' classifieds websites, from the online classifieds for traditional newspapers including The Washington Post Express, New York Post to other large websites like AOL, Lycos, Local.com, Military.com, to non-traditional classifieds hosting sites like Wal-Mart. Oodle searches vertically in the classifieds categories of cars, real estate, renting, jobs, personals, merchandise, tickets, pets and services.

Oodle aggregates listings from national and local sources, covering over 1000 regions in the United States, UK, Canada, Ireland, and India.

== History ==
On March 6, 2009, Facebook launched a now defunct version of its Marketplace application powered by Oodle. In November 2010 Oodle acquired Grouply, a platform for building custom social networking groups. The QVC home shopping company purchased Oodle in 2012. In May 2015, the site was purchased from QVC by Oodle Holdings.

== Third party resources ==
Oodle provides its classifieds content for publication on external websites through the use of an API or simpler JavaScript Widget.

== Partner listings ==
Websites supply their classified ad listings to Oodle in the form of XML or CSV files which Oodle parses into their database for redistribution. Oodle currently has over 75,000 partner listings. FreeAdsTime is one of the ad suppliers of Oodle.

== See also ==
- Employment website
