= Mortgage arrangement fee =

Mortgage arrangement fee, also known as a completion fee or a mortgage product fee, is a term used to describe the fee charged by some lenders to cover administration and primarily the reserving of funds for fixed rate and/or discounted rate mortgages. This fee may be paid separately, added to the mortgage loan increasing its size, or deducted from the value of loan that the lender is prepared to advance. The fee is usually between 0.5 and 1% of the loaned amount.
