= Geograph Channel Islands =

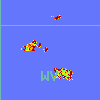
Image of Square of map project, showing red dots where photos have been taken

Geograph Channel Islands is a web-based project, initiated in April 2010, to create a freely accessible archive of geographically located photographs of the Channel Islands. Photographs in the Geograph Channel Islands collection are chosen to illustrate geographical features all parts of the Channel Islands. It is an offshoot of Geograph Britain and Ireland which began in March 2005.

A few examples of images on the site;

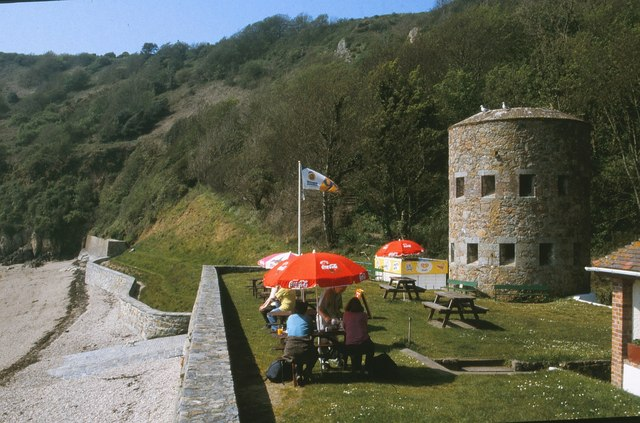
Fermain Bay, taken by Derek Harper on 1 May 1999

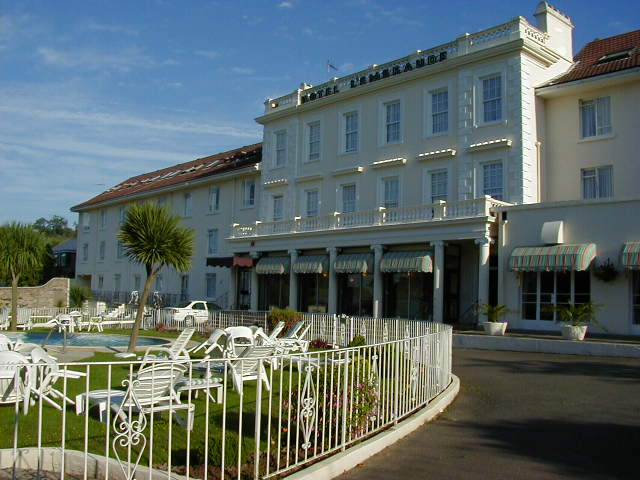
Hotel L'Emeraude, St Helier taken by DS Pugh on 14 August 2001

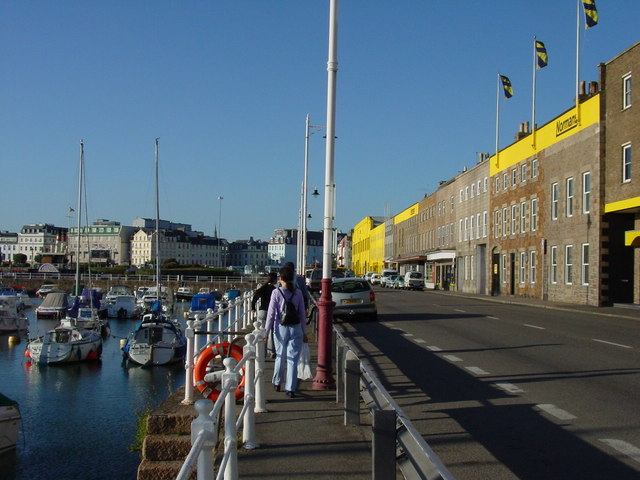
Commercial Buildings, St Helier, taken by Colin Park on 20 July 2005

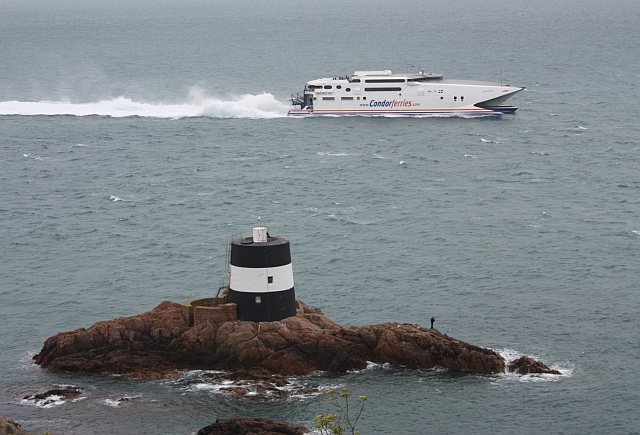
Noirmont Tower, taken by Bob Embleton on 12 August 2009

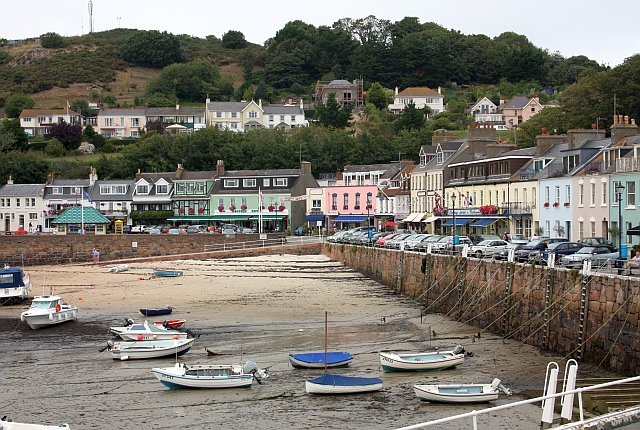
Gorey Harbour, taken by Bob Embleton on 12 August 2009
