= Moneyfacts Group =

UK financial information company

Moneyfacts
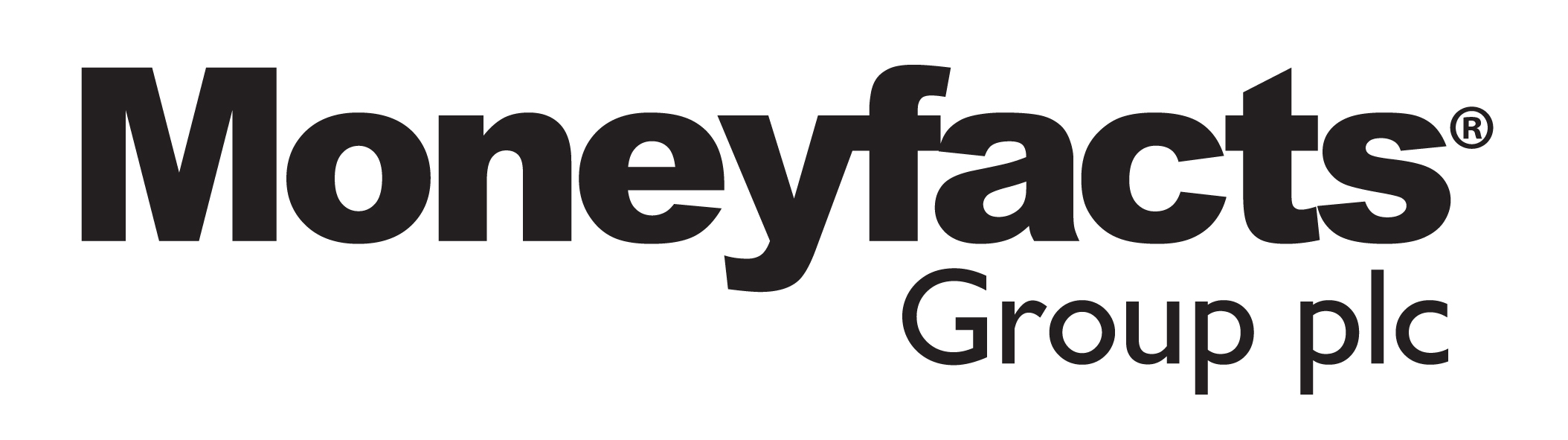
- Type: Financial services
- Founded: 1988
- Headquarters: Norwich, Norfolk, UK
- Key people: John Woods (Founder & Executive Chairman), Vicky Carter (Finance Director), Rob Hayles (IT Director), Richard Ward (Sales & Marketing Director).
- Number of employees: over 80
- Website: www.moneyfactsgroup.co.uk www.moneyfactscompare.co.uk

Moneyfacts Group Plc is a financial information company founded in 1988 based in Norwich in the United Kingdom, employing over 80 people.

== History ==
Moneyfacts was founded in 1988 by John Woods, who led the financial industry group which was established in Norwich. The first school of financial services outside London. He received an honorary doctor of civil law from the UEA. Moneyfacts was first launched as a six-page monthly fact sheet that brought personal finance products together to allow for comparison. This has since expanded to a range of magazines: Moneyfacts (personal finance products); Business Moneyfacts (business finance products); and Investment Life & Pensions Moneyfacts (pension and investment products). Moneyfacts now provides a range of financial product information services, including the price comparison website (Moneyfactscompare.co.uk), product analyser systems, treasury reports, executive reports, industry awards, and product star ratings. The brand has grown rapidly and is known throughout the UK as the independent and unbiased source of financial information. Moneyfacts Data is used throughout the UK financial industry. It is used by the Bank of England, Financial Conduct Authority, Financial Ombudsman Service, HM Treasury, Prudential Regulatory Authority, UK Finance and The Building Societies Association and, by virtually every bank and building society in the UK, it also powers other UK financial comparison websites. In 2025, moneyfactscompare.co.uk one of the UK's original price comparison websites from 2000, celebrated its 25th anniversary.

== Product chronology ==
- Moneyfacts Magazine - first published in 1988
- Business Moneyfacts Magazine - first published in 1994
- Investment Life & pensions – first published in 1996
- Moneyfactscompare.co.uk - launched in 2000
- Market Intelligence Reports – launched 2003
- Daily News Bulletin – launched 2003
- Web services and data feeds – launched 2005
- Treasury Reports – launched 2009
- Moneyfacts Annual Star Ratings - launched 2011
- Moneyfacts Analyser - launched 2012
- Moneyfacts API's for Savings & Mortgages - launched 2022
- Moneyfacts Consumer Duty Audit tool - launched 2023
- INTEREST publication - first issued July 2023
- Moneyfacts Onescreen - launched April 2024

== Activities ==
Moneyfacts' main activities are:

- Independently researching and monitoring thousands of the personal, business, investment life and pensions financial products that are available in the UK.
- Providing independent financial information and a subscription data service to financial institutions, the media, and Government in the UK. This includes the production of Best Buy tables for personal finance products.
- Publishing three monthly magazines: Moneyfacts, Business Moneyfacts and Investment, Life & Pensions Moneyfacts.
- Hosting Four annual awards: Consumer Moneyfacts Awards; Business Moneyfacts Awards; Moneyfacts Awards; and Investment Life and Pensions Moneyfacts Awards – which establish the best financial products in their sectors. These awards are widely reported in the national and financial press.
- Operating the financial price comparison website moneyfactscompare.co.uk. since 2000.
- Building and maintaining IT systems, which provide up-to-date financial information to banks and building societies in the UK, as well as intermediaries, the media, and Government.
- Annual assessment of a range of financial products in the form of Moneyfacts Annual Star Ratings.
- Publication of Treasury Reports which provide an in-depth review of the unsecured lending, mortgages, and savings markets.
- The benchmark Moneyfacts Average Mortgage Rate and Moneyfacts Average Savings Rate provide a daily close of business benchmark for consistent average rates for comparison.
- The journal INTEREST from Moneyfacts that seeks to identify the effects, positive or negative, interest rates have on the economy is regularly sourced in the press.

== Additional activities ==
- Moneyfacts’ data powers a number of financial comparison websites.
- Moneyfacts’ market commentary regularly appears within national newspapers and Moneyfacts representatives appear on, amongst others, BBC News, ITV News, and Sky News.
- Moneyfacts’ data is used by the HM Treasury, the Office of Fair Trading and the United Kingdom Parliament, the European Commission, the British Bankers Association, the Building Societies Association, the Council of Mortgage Lenders, the Financial Conduct Authority, the Financial Ombudsman Service, the Prudential Regulatory Authority and the Bank of England.
- Moneyfacts is a regular contributor of data to the Bank of England's Financial Stability Report, Trends in Lending and Inflation Reports.
- Moneyfacts provides Best Buy charts to the national and regional press including the Financial Times, The Sunday Times, The Times, Daily Express, Sunday Express, and The i.
- Moneyfacts launched in April 2024 Moneyfacts Onescreen, providing financial markets data from London Stock Exchange Group and Moneyfacts benchmarks.

== Controversies ==
In 2004, its rival Moneysupermarket.com paid Moneyfacts £3.9 million in an out of court settlement to settle a dispute of alleged intellectual property theft. At the time, Moneysupermarket was going public at a price between £864 million and £1.05 billion, and it was thought best to resolve the issue beforehand.

In 2007, the “best buy” tables used in the UK press were criticized by Mike Lazenby, the then 'maverick' CEO of the Kent Reliance Building Society, for not reflecting the products which offered the best long-term value, with Moneyfacts bearing the brunt of the criticism. The main objections were:

- At that time, Moneyfacts charged an £11,000 yearly fee to its subscribers, and did not always list non-subscribers in its best buy tables.
- It was possible for products to boost their position in best buy tables by offering short term introductory bonuses.

The historic issue was that some non-subscribers tended not to volunteer their data within the time required. With the benefit of more widely available digital data, this is no longer an issue. To resolve the issue of product providers manipulating submissions by introductory bonuses, Moneyfacts now produces its tables in versions with and without these bonuses.

Subsequently, in 2013, Moneyfacts were praised in the Sunday Times, which highlighted that Moneyfacts.co.uk always lists the genuine best buy products for its customers regardless of any financial arrangements with product providers, whilst other comparison websites were found to purely recommend financial products on a commercial basis.
