= National Approved Letting Scheme =

The National Approved Letting Scheme, NALS, is an accreditation scheme in the United Kingdom for lettings and management agents.

It aims to offer peace of mind to landlords and tenants in knowing that they are dealing with a firm which agrees to meet defined standards of customer service, together with having in place the necessary insurances to protect clients' money plus a customer complaints procedure offering independent redress.
