= Estate agent =

Person or business that sells or rents property in the United Kingdom

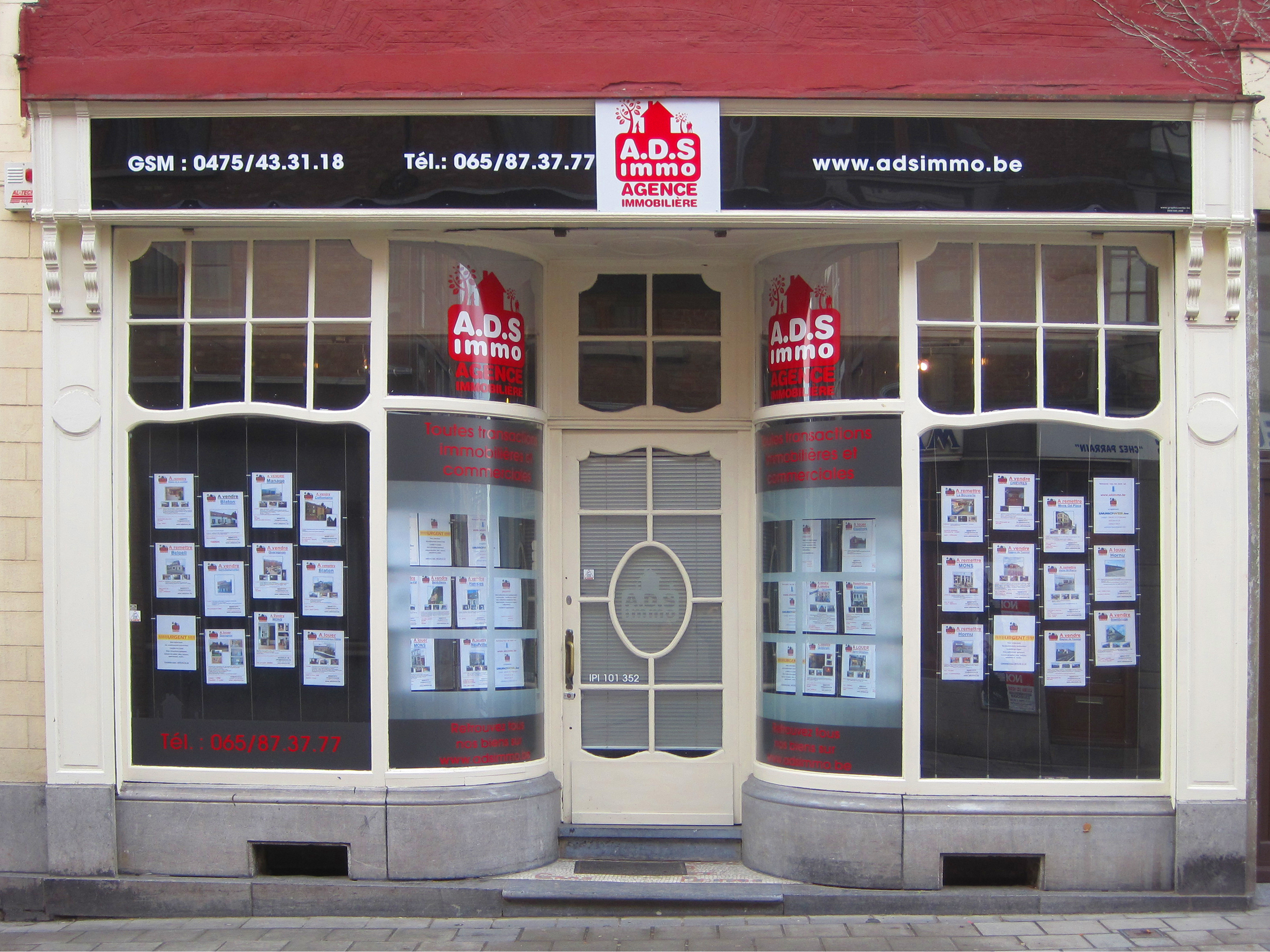
Front windows of a small estate agency in Mons, Belgium.

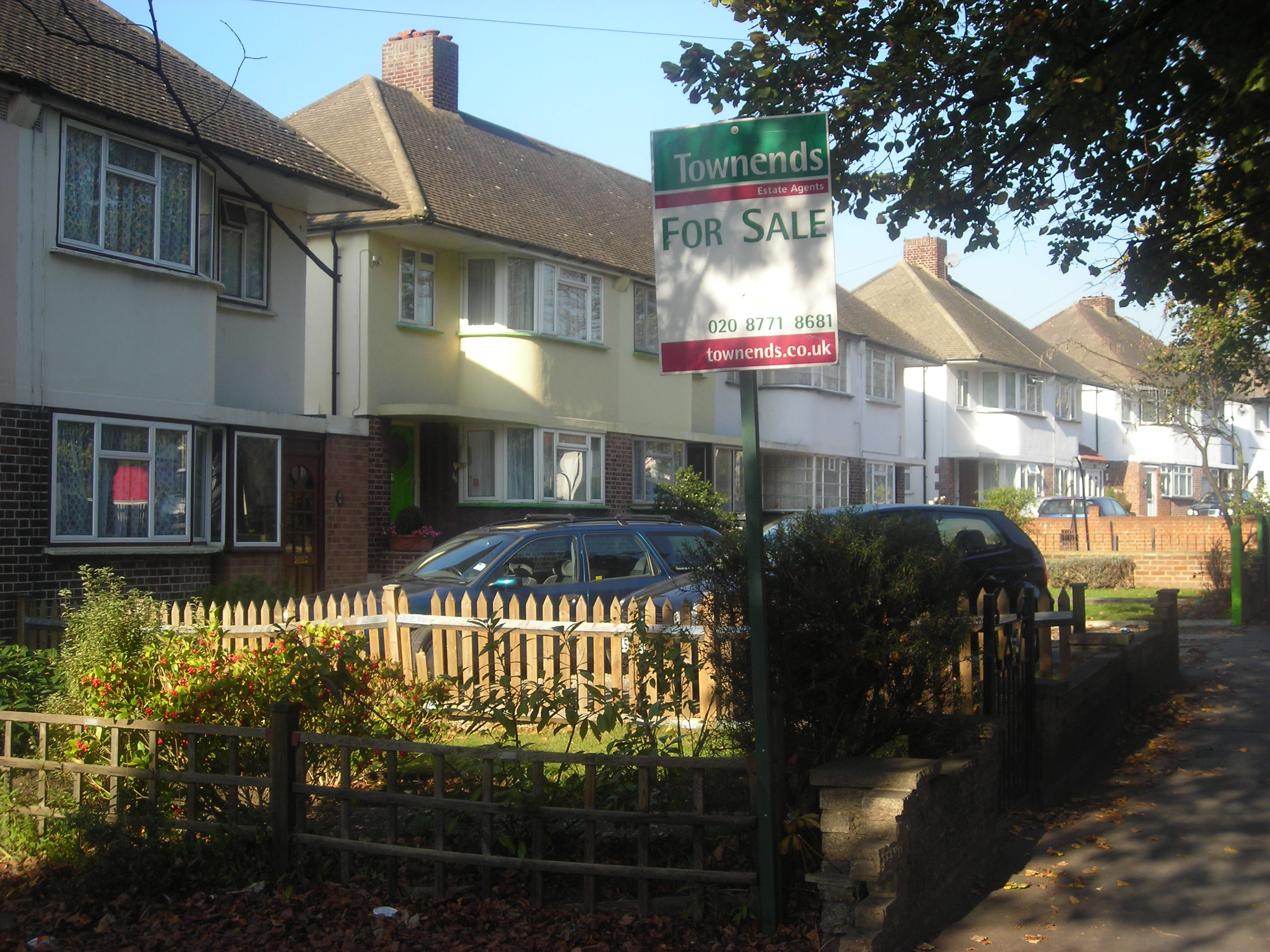
A house for sale in London

An estate agent is a person or business in the United Kingdom that arranges the selling, renting, or managing of properties and other buildings. An agent that specialises in renting is often called a letting or management agent. Estate agents are mainly engaged in the marketing of property available for sale and contract reassignments, and a solicitor or licensed conveyancer is used to prepare the legal documents. In Scotland, however, many solicitors also act as estate agents, a practice that is rare in England and Wales. In the other countries such as the United States, estate agents are more commonly called real estate agents.

"Estate agent" also remains the current title for the person responsible for the management of one group of privately owned, all or mostly tenanted properties under one ownership. Alternative titles are factor, steward, or bailiff, depending on the era, region, and extent of the property concerned.

== Origin ==
The term originally referred to a person responsible for managing a landed estate, while those engaged in the buying and selling of homes were "House Agents", and those selling land were "Land Agents". However, in the 20th century, "Estate Agent" started to be used as a generic term. An estate agent is roughly synonymous with the United States term real estate broker.

Estate agents need to be familiar with their local area, including factors that could increase or decrease property prices. e.g. if a new road or airport is to be built this can blight houses nearby. Equally, the closing of a quarry or improvement of an area can enhance prices. In advising clients on an asking price, the agent must be aware of recent sale prices (or rental values) for comparable properties.

== Regulation ==
In the United Kingdom, residential estate agents are regulated by the Estate Agents Act 1979 as well as the Consumers, Estate Agents, and Redress Act 2007.

In September 2012 CPRs (consumer protection regulation) was introduced which now regulates the residential sales process.

For residential property, there are also a few trade associations for estate agents, INEA The Independent Network of Estate Agents and NAEA Propertymark (formerly known as the National Association of Estate Agents). NAEA Propertymark members can be disciplined for breaches of their code of conduct. Their disciplinary process includes everything from cautions and warnings right through to more severe penalties of up to £5,000 for each rule breached, and a maximum penalty of €5 million for breaches of the specific anti money-laundering rules.

Some estate agents are members of the Royal Institution of Chartered Surveyors (RICS), the principal body for UK property professionals, dealing with both residential, commercial, and agricultural property. Members, known as "Chartered Surveyors", are elected based on examination and are required to adhere to a code of conduct, which includes regulations about looking after their clients' money and professional indemnity insurance in case of error or negligence.

The Property Ombudsman (TPO) was established in 1998 as Ombudsman for Estate Agents Scheme and obtained OFT approval for the Code of Practice for Residential Sales in 2006. As of April 2026, it claims that over 19,000 offices and branches have registered with them.

There is a legal requirement to belong to either organisation to trade as an estate agent. Agents can be fined if they are not a member of a redress scheme. The redress scheme was brought in alongside and to govern agents in reference to the HIP (Home Information Pack).

== Industry structure in the UK ==
A handful of national residential estate agents chains exist, with the majority being locally or regionally specialised companies.

Several multi-national commercial agencies exist, typically Anglo-American, pan-European, or global. These firms all seek to provide the full range of property advisory services, not just agency.

Only a handful of large firms trade in both commercial and residential property.

== Fees ==
Estate agents' fees are charged to the seller of the property. Estate agents normally charge the seller, on a 'no sale, no fee' basis, so that if the property doesn't sell, then the customer will not pay anything to the estate agent and the agent will have worked for the customer, free of charge. If the seller does sell the property and complete the sale of their property to a buyer that was introduced by the estate agent, then the estate agent will charge anything from 1% to 3.5%, with the average in 2018 being reported as 1.42% including VAT and this is calculated based on the sale price of the property.

Alternative estate agency models, most notably online estate agents, generally offer a choice of fees, most of which are either paid on an up front basis, or paid later on completion. Fees range from around £300 to £800.

=== Lettings ===
Estate agents who handle lettings of commercial property normally charge a fee of 7 to 15% of the first year's rent, plus the whole of the first month's rent. If two agents are charging 10%, they will split the fee between them. Estate agents selling commercial property (known as investment agents) typically charge 1% of the sale price.

The fees charged by residential letting agents vary, depending on whether the agent manages the property or simply procures new tenants. Charges to prospective tenants can vary from zero to £300 in non-refundable fees usually described as application, administration or processing fees (or all three). There are no guidelines for letting agents on charges, except that they are forbidden by law to charge a fee for a list of properties. All charges to tenants are illegal in Scotland. Otherwise, they are free to charge as they please in England and Wales.

The first month's rent in advance plus a refundable bond (usually equal to one month's rent) is also generally required. Most residential lettings in the UK are governed by assured shorthold tenancy contracts. Assured shorthold tenancies (generally referred to simply as "shorthold") give less statutory protection than earlier, mostly obsolete, types of residential lettings. Shorthold tenancy agreements are standard contracts; the wording is generally available from legal stationers and on the internet for around £1.00, although most lettings agents will charge £30 to provide one.

It is important that tenant referencing checks are in place prior to a tenant moving into a property. The credit check can be run using credit history data from Equifax, Experian or Call Credit (the three main UK providers) using an in-house website system or a managed referencing service. A reputable agent will also ask for an employment reference and a previous landlord reference to attempt to verify that the tenant can afford the rental on the property and that there were no serious problems with the previous agent. It is also essential that proof of identity and proof of residency are also collected and filed.

=== Selling ===
Estate agents selling residential property generally charge between 0.5% (sole agency) and 3% (multiple agency) of the achieved sale price plus VAT (Value Added Tax). Some agents may charge for additional marketing such as newspapers and websites; however, generally, the advertising is included in the fee. All fees must be clearly agreed upon and noted in the agency agreement before market so there is no confusion of additional charges.

In July 2016, Which? found the national average estate agents fees to be 1.3%, although fees vary widely.

Other than for the cheapest properties, estate agent fees are generally the second most expensive component of the cost of moving house in the United Kingdom after stamp duty.

High Street agents rarely charge upfront costs for selling, nor costs for aborting a sale and withdrawing a home from the market. So whilst other options are available to sell property with online agents they do often charge upfront fees with no guarantee of selling or perhaps the motivation a no-sale no-fee High Street agency will offer.

=== Other approaches ===
Since around 2005, online estate agents have provided an alternative to the traditional fee structure, claiming cheaper, fixed fee selling packages. These online estate agents claim to give private property sellers the ability to market their property via the major property portals (the preferred medium used by traditional high street estate agents) for a fraction of the cost of the traditional estate agency. Online estate agents claim that they can advertise a property as effectively as traditional estate agents by using digital marketing techniques and centralising their back office operation to one location, rather than having physical offices in the town in which they are based. Online estate agents normally cover the whole of the UK, therefore claiming to be able to reduce fees due to removing geographical boundaries that traditional estate agents generally have. Lastly, online estate agents often charge up front, instead of a traditional agent, who would normally charge nothing if the property is not sold

In February 2010 the Office of Fair Trading (OFT) announced that a change in the legislation for estate agents has led to a shake up in the way homes are sold, allowing cheaper online agents to become more established than they could before.

Intermediary estate agents and or property portals that are based in the United Kingdom have started to encourage UK and worldwide estate agents to collaborate by showing all their properties, thus allowing site visitors to see a vast array of UK and overseas properties all on one website.

Research undertaken in 2007 said that the most effective way of selling property is via 'For Sale' signs, 28% of customers had seen the estate agent's For Sale signs before researching more in depth into the properties. Searching for houses via the internet came in a close second (21%), with newspapers third at (17%). The fourth most effective way, and the most traditional, was customers visiting an estate agent's office (15%). In 2010 80% to 90% of properties were found via the internet and agents see fewer people walking into their offices. Boards are still very effective, but many agents are now cutting out paper advertising and moving just to digital such as eMags and just the web.

Other methods included auctions (11%), word of mouth (3%) and leaflets (2%).

== Technology ==
Estate agents use estate agency software to manage their buying applicants, property viewings, marketing and property sales. Estate agents can use the software to prepare property particulars which are used to advertise the property either online or in print. They can also record the requirements of a buying applicant and automatically match them against their database of properties. Once a sale is agreed upon, they can manage the chain of linked property sales using the software.

Estate agency software will also help with property marketing by automatically distributing the property details to property portals.

The latest technology has influenced the growth of Online Agents, and the property sector becoming more reliant on the use of technology to appeal to the consumer market. An example of a company conducting this currently is Matterport, who have created a camera that creates digital 3D models and VR floorpans and ultra HD photography. This has led to digital marketers being able to influence online behaviour in the property market through the use of a Web Portal. By using secure websites, marketers then have the ability to monitor the level of user activity and gain invaluable information to help sellers and estate agents to utilise their marketing and better appeal to the needs of their customers.

In recent years agents have started working together again through systems similar to the USA called MLS (multi listing service). This is where a main agent will take on a property and send details via the most to other local (sub) agents. The sub agents will market and introduce applicants to the main agent. MLS can achieve more offers, sell a property quicker, and is offered by agents as a premium service.

In the US property data is passed from the agents software by the RETS data feed schema. In the UK the INEA idx (information data exchange) data feed is being adopted by many software to receive sub (mls) property listings back.

In both cases technology via MLS and idx means that sub agents collaborating can populate many more properties into their websites by working together.

== Working as an estate agent ==
In Britain, no formal qualifications are required to become an estate agent; however, local property knowledge and customer-service skills are considered worthwhile.

== Estate agent speak ==
A humorous guide to estate agent language was published by the BBC in 2002.

== See also ==
- Buying agent
- Real estate broker
- Real estate business
- Real estate development
- Real estate bubble
