= Houseful (company) =

British real estate company

Houseful Limited
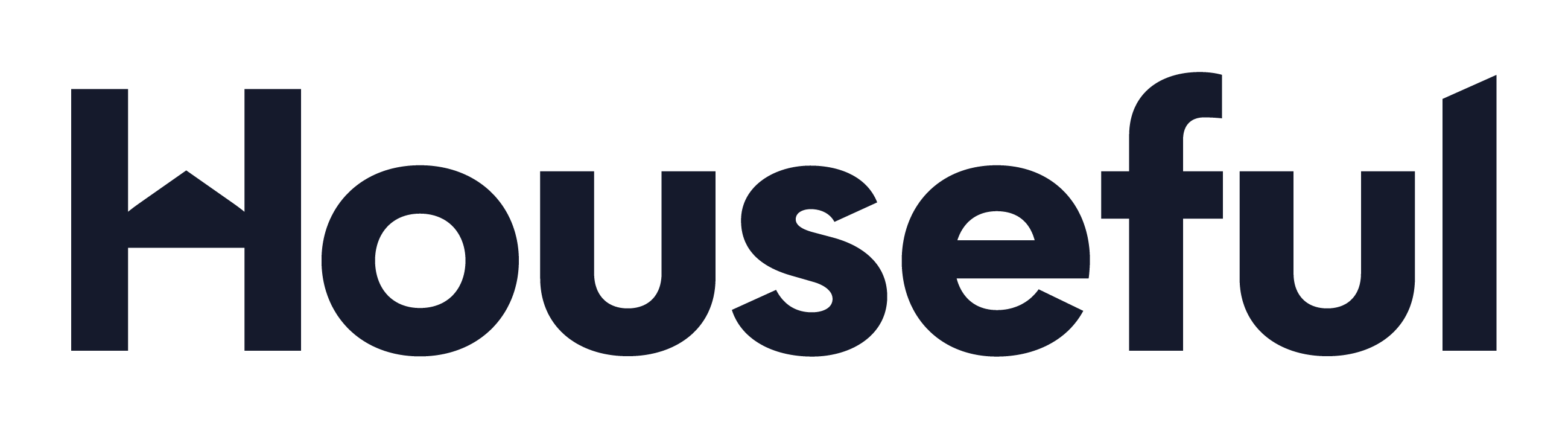
- Type: Private
- Industry: Software, real estate
- Predecessor: Zoopla Property Group
- Founded: January 2008; 18 years ago
- Founders: Harrison Wright; Simon Kain; Alex Chesterman
- Headquarters: London, England, UK
- Number of locations: United Kingdom
- Area served: United Kingdom
- Key people: Charlie Bryant, CEO
- Services: Property and Comparison search Software
- Revenue: £317.3 million (2018)
- Owner: Silver Lake Partners (since 2018)
- Number of employees: 600
- Parent: Silver Lake Partners
- Divisions: Zoopla, Hometrack, Alto, Jupix, Primelocation, Calcasa, Mojo Mortgages, Yourkeys
- Website: houseful.co.uk

Houseful Limited is a British residential property software, data, and insight company based in London, England, owned by Silver Lake Partners.

Its brands include the property website Zoopla, automated valuations (AVMs) provider Hometrack, and software brand Alto. Alongside these sites, Houseful owns and operates several brands providing services to estate agents, housebuilders, brokers, lenders, and consumers. These include Jupix, Calcasa, Primelocation, Yourkeys and Mojo. ZPG Ltd., Houseful's previous parent company, which included the brands USwitch and Money.co.uk, was listed on the London Stock Exchange until it was acquired by Silver Lake Partners in July 2018.

== History ==
The company was originally founded as Zoopla in 2007 by Alex Chesterman and Simon Kain. Chesterman and Kain also founded ScreenSelect (later LoveFilm). The Zoopla website was launched in January 2008. Zoopla was backed by Accomplice, Octopus Ventures and other investors. In July 2009, Zoopla acquired property website Thinkproperty.com from the Guardian Media Group.

In August 2009, Zoopla acquired the PropertyFinder Group, consisting of the websites Propertyfinder.com, Hotproperty.co.uk and UK Property Shop, from prior owners the REA Group and News International for an undisclosed sum. These businesses had combined annual revenues of £7 million. In January 2011, Zoopla acquired the historic database of UK house prices HousePrices.co.uk.

In October 2011, Zoopla and Digital Property Group, the subsidiary of A&N Media, operating property websites Primelocation.com, Globrix.com and FindaProperty.com, merged their respective businesses. In May 2012, Zoopla acquired property information website UpMyStreet.com.

In April 2016, Zoopla acquired property software firm PSG for £75 million from Lloyd’s private equity arm LDC.

In May 2018, Hometrack sold off the Australian arm of its business for £71m. It was sold to property portal and media business REA. In January 2021, Hometrack acquired the mortgage automation arm of EDM Group.

In November 2020, ZPG sold the company Ravensworth back to its original owning entity, The Printed Group.

In April 2021, the company acquired software provider Yourkeys.

=== 2012: Formation of Zoopla Property Group (ZPG) ===
In June 2012, Zoopla and its constabularies formed Zoopla Property Group Ltd. Zoopla's biggest shareholder, the Daily Mail and General Trust, floated Zoopla on the London Stock Exchange in June 2014.

In June 2015, Zoopla bought the price comparison website Uswitch for £190m. In February 2017, the company changed its name to ZPG plc. In September 2017, Zoopla purchased the financial services comparison website Money.co.uk for £140 million.

=== 2018: Acquisition of ZPG by Silver Lake Partners ===
In May 2018, US private equity firm Silver Lake Partners made a $2.2 billion bid for ZPG's property division (now Houseful) and its comparison division RVU. The transaction was completed in July 2018.

=== 2023: ZPG Property Division rebrands as Houseful ===
In September 2023, the ZPG property division was renamed Houseful to reflect the evolution of the business from a property website to a software, data and insights business in residential property. ZPG’s comparison division remains known as RVU.

== Operations ==
Houseful operates across three distinct business units: Homes, Software, and Data and Risk. The Homes business unit includes Zoopla, Mojo Mortgages, and Prime Location.

The Software business unit connects businesses and consumers, powering more than half of all UK housing transactions each year. It includes brands Alto, Jupix, and Yourkeys.

The Data and Risk business unit is focused on increased automation across the mortgage lending and wider property industries. It includes the brands of Hometrack and Calcasa.

== See also ==
- Rightmove
