= Rightmove =

British real estate and property website

Rightmove plc
- Formerly: Rightmove Group Limited (14–29 November 2007); Rightmove Group plc (2007–2008)
- Type: Public
- Traded as: LSE: RMV; FTSE 250 component
- Industry: Internet and Real Estate
- Founded: 2000
- Headquarters: Milton Keynes, England
- Key people: Andrew Fisher (Chair); Johan Svanstrom (CEO)
- Revenue: ▲£425.1 million (2025)
- Operating income: ▲£287.9 million (2025)
- Net income: ▲£217.1 million (2025)
- Website: rightmove.co.uk

Rightmove plc is a British company which runs rightmove.co.uk and the rightmove app. It is the largest online real estate property portal in the United Kingdom. Rightmove is listed on the London Stock Exchange and is a constituent of the FTSE 250 Index.

== History ==
Rightmove was incorporated on 16 May 2000 and it launched its website, rightmove.co.uk, in July 2000. Rightmove's founding shareholders were Countrywide plc, Halifax, Royal & Sun Alliance and Connells.

Rightmove was first listed on the London Stock Exchange on 15 March 2006 at which time it became Rightmove plc.

In 2007 Rightmove bought 67% of Holiday Lettings Limited. In May 2008, HBOS, one of the founding investors, sold its stake in Rightmove. According to Forbes, Rightmove operates on a two-sided model which serves a vast "audience" for property listings on one side and 20,000 advertisers of available properties on the other side.

Peter Brooks-Johnson, who joined Rightmove in 2006, became chief operating officer in 2013 and was promoted to chief executive officer in 2017.

In May 2016, Rightmove was ranked as the world's most innovative company by Forbes. In August 2016, the company acquired The Outside View, a London based predictive analytics company.

In June 2018, the Rightmove tenant Passport was launched.

In July 2019, the company acquired Van Mildert, which provides tenant referencing services and rent guarantee insurance products.

In November 2019, the company announced the appointment of Andrew Fisher as its chairman, succeeding Scott Forbes who was in the role for over 14 years.

Johan Svanström, a former chief executive of travel booking website Expedia and McDonald's became chief executive officer in February 2023. His appointment followed the resignation of Peter Brooks-Johnson in May 2022.

In September 2024, Rightmove's board rejected an informal £5.6 billion takeover offer from the REA Group, describing it as opportunistic and stating that it undervalued the company. REA Group had offered 705p per share, representing a 27% premium. The offer came as Rightmove faced difficulties in the property market and aligned with the Murdoch family's efforts to expand beyond traditional media. REA Group abandoned its takeover plan without making a formal offer.

== Operations ==
Rightmove makes money from listing estate agents on its website and offering additional advertising products to those agents. The ads are visible to users who search for the area chosen by the estate agent. Individuals selling property privately (i.e. directly without an agent) are prohibited from advertising on the site. Each month, Rightmove release a House Price Index, illustrating any changes in the asking prices of houses throughout England and Wales.

== See also ==
- Houseful (company)
