= Northcliffe Media =

British regional newspaper publisher

Northcliffe Media Limited
- Type: Private
- Industry: New media
- Defunct: 21 November 2015
- Successor: Local World
- Headquarters: London, England
- Owner: Daily Mail and General Trust
- Website: Archived 9 February 2012 at the Wayback Machine

Northcliffe Media (formerly Northcliffe Newspapers Group) was a large regional newspaper publisher in the UK and Central and Eastern Europe. In 2012 the company was sold by Daily Mail and General Trust (DMGT) to a newly formed company, Local World, which also bought Iliffe News and Media from the Yattendon Group. In October 2015, Trinity Mirror, later Reach plc, bought Local World.

It operated from over 30 publishing centres, and also had 18 daily titles. The main publishing centres for the newspapers were South West Wales Publications in Swansea, Bristol Print Centre in Bristol, Derby Print Centre in Derby, Rockwell Universal in Grimsby, Leicester Print Centre in Leicester, Plymouth Print Centre in Plymouth and Stoke Print Centre in Stoke on Trent. All publishing centres except Swansea and Grimsby have since closed.

Northcliffe ran a print and publishing service to businesses and organisations across the UK and Ireland. It also operated a retail division with 67 outlets and had Hungarian newspaper interests. It also claimed to be one of the top two publishers, in terms of circulation, in Slovakia after 2 1/2 years in the country, and to have invested £22 million in the Eastern European market between 2004 and 2007. They owned Avizo, the leading daily classified newspaper in Slovakia, City Express was acquired, including two fortnightly titles, Auto Burza, a motors classified product and Burza Nehnutel’nosti, a property magazine.

== History ==
In November 2005, the DMGT announced that it wanted to sell Northcliffe Newspapers, at the time worth over £1.5bn. It came after figures according to Ofcom announced that Northcliffe only has 16% of the regional market, compared to Trinity's 20%, Newsquest's 18% and 15% for Johnston. This was cancelled after they could not find an offer for the group as a whole. On 6 July 2007, the company bought 26 regional titles from Trinity Mirror plc for the sum of £64.15 million. The group said it had bought three of Trinity Mirror's local divisions, East Surrey and Sussex Newspapers, Kent Regional Newspapers and Blackmore Vale Publishing, included the Croydon Advertiser, Blackmore Vale magazine, Medway News and the Kingston Informer. The sale was expected to boost Northcliffe's circulation by 872,000 copies per week.

The company's name was changed to Northcliffe Media from Northcliffe Newspaper Group in 2007.

In July 2011, it was announced that Northcliffe Media intended to sell nine of its titles to the KM Group. The newspapers involved include the Dover Express, East Kent Gazette, Folkestone Herald, Herne Bay and Whitstable Times, Isle of Thanet Gazette, Medway News and Thanet Times. km Group has referred the matter of the acquisition of the titles to the Office of Fair Trading.

In November 2012 DMGT sold Northcliffe Media to Local World. In October 2015, Trinity Mirror announced that it was acquiring the whole of Local News.

== A&N International Media ==
A&N International Media, formerly Northcliffe International, was the Central and Eastern European multimedia enterprise arm of Northcliffe Media. It had newspapers throughout Slovakia, Romania and Bulgaria, with their biggest market in Hungary. It also had website interests in Croatia, owning four shopping, home and car websites as well as in Slovakia and Hungary.

The international arm began in 1989, when the Northcliffe Newspaper Group acquired Kisalföld, the largest regional newspaper in Hungary, serving the north-western county of Győr-Sopron. The group later acquired Délmagyarország, the largest daily title in the south-east of the country, and the English-language weekly newspaper, The Budapest Sun. Northcliffe also invested significantly in new headquarters and printing plants in both Győr and Szeged.

The total Eastern European business had revenues of £35 million per year and annualised profits of around £6 million. The arm had 801 overseas workers in 2006, but after the arrival in the Croatian market in March 2007, this exceeded 1,000. The chairman of the European arm was Vivian Baring and the director was István Szammer.

=== Hungary ===
In Hungary Kisalföld, a morning newspaper based in Győr, had the highest circulation of any regional title in the country, selling an average 78,000 copies Monday to Saturday. It also published a daily edition for the town of Sopron. Northcliffe International also published Délmagyarország, Hungary's oldest regional daily newspaper and the largest selling title in the south-eastern region. In addition it published Délvilág for Csongrád county. Other publications included classified titles Magyar Bazár and Irányár. Websites included Használtautó, a car finder website (similar to that of DMGT's Loot Newspaper and website in Britain), Ingatlanbazár, a house finder website (similar to that of DMGT's Primelocation website in the UK) and Workania, a work finder website (yet again similar to Jobsite in the UK owned by DMGT).

Other newspapers owned by the group included the paid-for:

- Déli Apró
- Délmagyarország
- Hírpressz
- Irányár Bács
- Irányár Békés
- Irányár Szolnok
- Magyar Bazár Álmos
- Magyar Bazár Huba
- Magyar Bazár Koppány
- Magyar Bazár Tas
- Vasárnapi Kisalföld

And the free:

- Budapesti Cégregiszter
- Csongrád Megyei Cégregiszter
- Csongrádi-Szentesi Hirdeto"
- Gyo"ri Cégregiszter
- Gyo"rpress
- Lajtapress
- Makói Hirdeto"
- Presztizs Magazin
- Rábaközpress
- Soproni Szuperinfo
- Sopronpress
- Szolnoki Hirdeto"
- Vas Megyei Cégregiszter
- Vásárhelyi Hirdeto"

=== Slovakia and Bulgaria ===
In 2004 Northcliffe International acquired Avizo, Slovakia's biggest daily advertising magazine which included nearly 8,000 advertisements daily. Other acquisitions included City Express, a free weekly paper distributing 160,000 copies in and around Bratislava, the country's leading recruitment website Profesia.sk, the leading motors website Autovia.sk, and the quality daily newspaper Pravda, the oldest national title in Slovakia with a circulation of 78,000. Northcliffe's Slovakian business, in which it invested a total of £23 million, employed over 300 people and generates revenues of £12 million.

Other newspapers owned by the Slovakian arm of the group included:

- Burza Nehnutel'nosti
- Profesia

In Bulgaria, Northcliffe International owned the daily Bulgarian newspaper Pozvanete, established in 1992. Pozvanete is the leading paid-for classified advertising newspaper in the region with copies sold in Sofia, Varna and Plovdiv. The title employed more than 200 people.

=== Croatia and Romania ===
Northcliffe International entered the Croatian market in March 2007 with the purchase of 60 per cent of the country's leading recruitment website Mojposao.hr. The site controls 85 per cent of the country's online jobs market. Northcliffe invested almost £12 million on digital assets in Hungary, Slovakia and Croatia. Other websites included 4kotaca.net, centarnekretnina.net and kupiprodaj.net.

In Romania, Northcliffe International's activities extended further with the acquisition of the classified title Anunţ A-Z in Bucharest. Anunţ A-Z was established in 1990 as a bi-weekly classified advertising periodical and sold 12,000 copies per issue mainly in Bucharest. The title also has a dedicated website.

== Titles ==
Northcliffe Media claimed that over 3,272,302 people had visited all of its local sites for all the newspapers, with the most hit site being the Derbyshire. Northcliffe's core business was the production, printing and distribution of Regional Newspapers alongside its online 'thisis' network.

- Adscene
- Advertiser Series (Hull)
- Ashby and Coalville Mail
- Ashford Herald
- Axholme Herald
- Bath Chronicle
- Bath Times
- Brentwood Gazette Series
- Brides in Cornwall
- Bridgwater Times
- Bristol Evening Post
- Bristol Observer Series
- Burnham and Highbridge Times
- Cannock & Rugeley Mercury
- Carmarthen Herald
- Carmarthen Journal
- Cheadle Post and Times
- Cheltenham News
- Clevedon Mercury
- Cornish Guardian
- Cornwall Today
- Crawley News
- Croydon Advertiser
- Croydon Post
- Deal and Sandwich Express
- Derby Telegraph
- Derby Express Group
- Dover Express
- Essex Chronicle
- East Grinstead Courier
- East Lindsey Target
- East Kent Gazette
- Exeter Times
- Express and Echo
- Folkestone Herald
- The Forester
- Forest of Dean and Wye Valley Review
- Gainsborough Targe
- Gloucester News
- Gloucestershire Echo
- Great Barr Observer
- Grimsby Target
- Grimsby Telegraph
- Herne Bay Times
- Hythe Herald
- Hull Daily Mail
- Isle of Thanet Gazette
- Kingston Informer
- Kent and Sussex Courier
- Leek Post and Times
- Leicester Mail Group
- Leicester Mercury
- Lichfield Mercury Series
- Lincoln Target
- Lincolnshire Echo
- Llanelli Star Series
- Loughborough Mail
- Mansfield and Ashfield Recorder
- Medway News
- Mendip Messenger
- Mid Devon Gazette Series
- Mid Somerset Series
- Moorlands Advertiser
- Neath & Port Talbot Courier
- News In Focus
- North Devon Journal
- North Staffs Advertiser
- Nottingham Evening Post
- Nottingham Recorder
- Plymouth Extra
- Retford Times
- Romney Marsh Herald
- Scunthorpe Target
- Scunthorpe Telegraph
- Sevenoaks Chronicle
- Somerset Guardian Standard
- South Cheshire Advertiser Series
- South Lincs Target Group
- South Wales Evening Post
- The Sentinel (Staffordshire)
- Sutton Coldfield Observer
- Surrey Mirror
- Swansea Herald of Wales
- Tamworth Herald
- Tamworth Leader
- Taunton Times
- Thanet Times
- The Citizen (Gloucester)
- The Cornishman
- The Herald (Plymouth)
- Torbay Weekender Series
- Torquay Herald Express
- Uttoxeter Post and Times
- Venue (Bristol)
- Walsall Advertiser
- Wellington Weekly News
- The West Briton
- West Wiltshire Advertiser
- Western Daily Press (Bristol)
- Western Gazette
- Western Morning News
- Weston and Worle News
- Whitstable Times
- Wolds Target
- Yeovil Times

== Subsidiaries ==
Some former subsidiaries of the group included Northcliffe Retail and a 25% shareholding in the website Fish4. Associated Northcliffe Digital (AND) was the online arm of the Northcliffe Media Ltd, one of the largest and most successful regional newspaper publishers in the UK. Its daily titles had a combined sale of more than one million copies per day and its paid-for weeklies sold in excess of 490,000 copies. Each week the Group also distributed 2.6 million copies of its free newspapers.
