= Local World =

British regional newspaper publisher owned by Reach plc and headquartered in London

Local World Holdings Ltd.
- Company type: Private
- Industry: Publishing
- Founded: 2012
- Defunct: 2015 (merged into Trinity Mirror)
- Headquarters: London, United Kingdom
- Key people: David Montgomery; Chief Executive Officer; Rachel Addison; Chief Operating Officer/Chief Financial Officer
- Owner: Reach plc
- Subsidiaries: List of Subsidiaries

Local World Holdings Ltd. was a large regional newspaper publisher in the UK that published around 100 print titles and more than 70 websites. It was formed in 2012 by David Montgomery, a former chief executive of Trinity Mirror, to buy the Daily Mail and General Trust's Northcliffe Media business, and the Yattendon Group's Iliffe newspaper group.

In October 2015 Trinity Mirror, now Reach plc, bought the company. The sale was completed on 13 November 2015. In April 2017 the Local World website started redirecting to the Trinity Mirror website.

== History ==
Local World was established in 2012 by David Montgomery, in order to purchase local newspaper businesses.

In November 2012, it was announced that it would purchase Northcliffe Media from Daily Mail and General Trust, and separately, the Iliffe newspaper group from the Yattendon Group. The purchase of the businesses was approved by the Office of Fair Trading on 28 June 2013.

In September 2015, Daily Mail and General Trust confirmed it had entered into talks to sell Local World to Trinity Mirror; the sale was completed the following month.

== Titles ==
=== Local World ===
- Adscene
- Advertiser Series (Hull)
- Ashby and Coalville Mail
- Ashford Herald
- Axholme Herald
- Bath Chronicle
- Bath Times
- Boston Standard
- Brentwood Gazette series
- Brides in Cornwall
- Bridgwater Times
- Bristol Post
- Bristol Observer series
- Burnham and Highbridge Times
- Cannock & Rugeley Mercury
- Carmarthen Herald
- Carmarthen Journal
- Cheadle Post and Times
- Cheltenham News
- Clevedon Mercury
- Cornish Guardian
- Cornwall Today
- Crawley News
- The Croydon Advertiser
- Croydon Post
- Deal and Sandwich Express
- Derby Telegraph
- Derby Express Group
- Dover Express
- Essex Chronicle
- East Grinstead Courier
- East Lindsey Target
- East Kent Gazette
- Exeter Times
- Faversham Times
- Express & Echo
- Folkestone Herald
- Gainsborough Target
- Gloucestershire Echo
- Great Barr Observer
- Grimsby Target
- Grimsby Telegraph
- Herne Bay Times
- Hythe Herald
- Hull Daily Mail
- Isle of Thanet Gazette
- Kingston Informer
- Kent and Sussex Courier
- Leek Post and Times
- Leicester Mail Group
- Leicester Mercury
- Lichfield Mercury Series
- Lincoln Target
- Lincolnshire Echo
- Llanelli Star Series
- Loughborough Mail
- Mansfield and Ashfield Recorder
- Medway News
- Mendip Messenger
- Mid Devon Gazette Series
- Mid Somerset Series
- Moorlands Advertiser
- Neath & Port Talbot Courier
- News In Focus
- North Devon Journal
- North Staffs Advertiser
- Nottingham Post
- Nottingham Recorder
- Plymouth Extra
- Retford Times
- Romney Marsh Herald
- Scunthorpe Target
- Scunthorpe Telegraph
- Sevenoaks Chronicle
- Somerset Guardian Standard
- South Cheshire Advertiser Series
- South Lincs Target Group
- South Wales Evening Post
- The Sentinel
- Stroud Life
- Sutton Coldfield Observer
- Surrey Mirror
- Swansea Herald of Wales
- Tamworth Herald
- Tamworth Leader
- Taunton Times
- Thanet Times
- The Citizen (Gloucester)
- The Cornishman
- The Herald (Plymouth)
- Torbay Weekender Series
- Torquay Herald Express
- Uttoxeter Post and Times
- Venue (Bristol)
- Walsall Advertiser
- The West Briton
- West Wiltshire Advertiser
- Western Daily Press (Bristol)
- Western Gazette
- Western Morning News
- Weston and Worle News
- Whitstable Times
- Wolds Target
- Yeovil Times

=== Iliffe News and Media titles ===
- Cambridge News
- Hertfordshire Mercury
- Herts & Essex Observer
- Harlow Star
- The Advertiser
- Bedfordshire on Sunday
- Dunstable on Sunday
- Leighton Buzzard on Sunday
- Luton on Sunday
- OneMK (Milton Keynes)
- Burton Mail
- Staffordshire Newsletter
- Ashbourne News Telegraph
- Uttoxeter Advertiser
- Black Country Bugle
- Your Leek Paper
- Nuneaton News
- Staffordshire Life

=== Websites ===
- Kent Live
