= Cornwall & Devon Media =

Cornwall & Devon Media is the Westcountry division of Reach.

In 2012, Local World acquired Cornwall & Devon Media owner Northcliffe Media from Daily Mail and General Trust. In October 2015, Trinity Mirror (Now Reach plc) reached agreement with Local World's other shareholders to buy the company.

== Publications ==
Cornish Guardian, The Cornishman, Exeter & Express Echo, Mid Devon Gazette Series, North Devon Journal, Plymouth Evening Herald, The West Briton, Cornwall Today magazine, magazine and the Torquay Herald Express.
