= SomersetLive =

British regional news website publisher owned by Reach plc and headquartered in Yeovil

Somerset Live
- Website type: Regional newspapers website
- Headquarters: Yeovil, {{{location_country}}}
- Area served: Somerset and nearby
- Owner: Reach plc
- Editor: Emma Slee
- Industry: Publishing
- Website: somersetlive.co.uk
- Commercial: yes
- Current status: Active

SomersetLive is a website covering news, entertainment and sport in Somerset and nearby areas in Dorset and Wiltshire. It is owned by Reach plc, with headquarters in Yeovil.

The SomersetLive website moved onto a new platform in March 2017, and subsequently took over the websites of additional regional daily newspapers.

It operates as the website for a number of local newspapers, including:

- Bath Chronicle
- Central Somerset Gazette
- Cheddar Valley Gazette
- Frome Standard and Somerset Guardian
- Shepton Mallet Journal
- Wells Journal
- Western Gazette
