= A&N International Media =

Multimedia enterprise arm of Daily Mail and General Trust

A&N International Media, formerly Northcliffe International, was the Central and Eastern European multimedia enterprise arm of Daily Mail and General Trust. It had newspapers throughout Slovakia, Romania and Bulgaria, with their biggest market in Hungary. They also had website interests in Croatia, owning four shopping, home and car websites as well as in Slovakia and Hungary.

The international arm began in 1989, when the Northcliffe Newspaper Group acquired Kisalföld, the largest regional newspaper in Hungary, serving the north-western county of Győr-Sopron. The group later acquired Délmagyarország, the largest daily title in the south-east of the country, and the English-language weekly newspaper, The Budapest Sun. Northcliffe also invested significantly in new headquarters and printing plants in both Győr and Szeged.

DMGT sold its Central and Eastern European properties in 2012 and 2013:

- Használtautó was sold to Schibsted
- jobs websites in the Slovak, Czech and Croatian markets, and minority stakes of job websites operating in the Serbian and Bosnian markets were sold to Alma Media
- the Hungarian newspapers were sold to Elliott Management Corporation

== Hungary ==
In Hungary Kisalföld, a morning newspaper based in Győr, had the highest circulation of any regional title in the country, selling an average 78,000 copies Monday to Saturday. It also publishes a daily edition for the town of Sopron. Northcliffe International also published Délmagyarország, Hungary's oldest regional daily newspaper and the largest selling title in the south-eastern region. In addition it published Délvilág for Csongrád county. Other publications included classified titles Magyar Bazár and Irányár. Websites included Használtautó, a car finder website (similar to that of DMGT's Loot newspaper and website in Britain), Ingatlanbazár, a house finder website (similar to that of DMGT's Primelocation website in the UK) and Workania, a work finder website (yet again similar to Jobsite in the UK owned by DMGT).

Other newspapers owned by the group included the paid-for:

- Déli Apró
- Délmagyarország
- Hírpressz
- Irányár Bács
- Irányár Békés
- Irányár Szolnok
- Magyar Bazár Álmos
- Magyar Bazár Huba
- Magyar Bazár Koppány
- Magyar Bazár Tas
- Vasárnapi Kisalföld

And the free:

- Budapesti Cégregiszter
- Csongrád Megyei Cégregiszter
- Csongrádi-Szentesi Hirdeto"
- Gyo"ri Cégregiszter
- Gyo"rpress
- Lajtapress
- Makói Hirdeto"
- Presztizs Magazin
- Rábaközpress
- Soproni Szuperinfo
- Sopronpress
- Szolnoki Hirdeto"
- Vas Megyei Cégregiszter
- Vásárhelyi Hirdeto"

== Slovakia and Bulgaria ==
In 2004 Northcliffe International acquired Avizo, Slovakia's biggest daily advertising magazine which includes nearly 8,000 advertisements daily. Other acquisitions include City Express, a free weekly paper distributing 160,000 copies in and around Bratislava, the country's leading recruitment website Profesia.sk, the leading motors website Autovia.sk, and the quality daily newspaper Pravda, the oldest national title in Slovakia with a circulation of 78,000. Northcliffe's Slovak business, in which it has invested a total of £23 million, employed over 300 people and generated revenues of £12 million.

Other newspapers owned by the Slovak arm of the group included:

- Burza Nehnutel'nosti
- Profesia

In Bulgaria, Northcliffe International owned the daily Bulgarian newspaper Pozvanete, established in 1992. Pozvanete was the leading paid-for classified advertising newspaper in the region with copies sold in Sofia, Varna and Plovdiv. The title employed more than 200 people.

== Croatia and Romania ==
Northcliffe International entered the Croatian market in March 2007 with the purchase of 60 per cent of the country's leading recruitment website Mojposao.hr. The site controlled 85 per cent of the country's online jobs market. Northcliffe invested almost £12 million on digital assets in Hungary, Slovakia and Croatia. Other websites included; 4kotaca.net, centarnekretnina.net and kupiprodaj.net

In Romania, Northcliffe International's activities extended further with the acquisition of the classified title Anunţ A-Z in Bucharest. Anunţ A-Z was established in 1990 as a bi-weekly classified advertising periodical and sold 12,000 copies per issue mainly in Bucharest. The title also had a dedicated website.
