= Burton Mail =

British daily newspaper

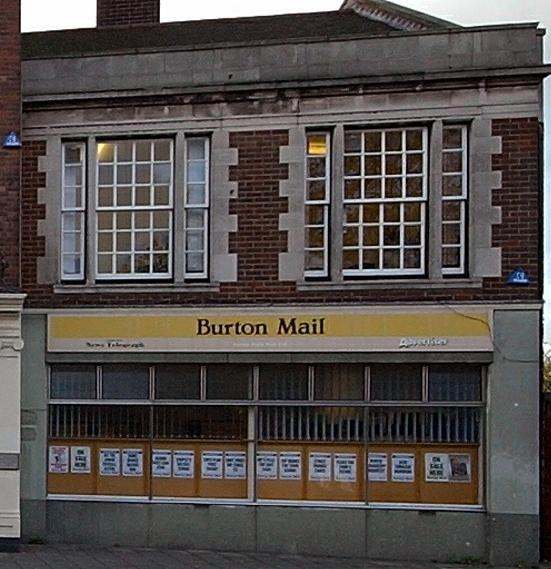
- Former Burton Mail Head Office (until 2015)
- Type: Daily newspaper
- Format: Tabloid
- Owner: Trinity Mirror
- Language: English
- Headquarters: Nottingham
- Circulation: 2,607 (as of 2022)
- Website: www.burtonmail.co.uk

The Burton Mail (formerly the Burton Daily Mail) is a British daily newspaper published each weekday and on Saturdays. It covers the East Staffordshire, South Derbyshire and North West Leicestershire areas. In the period December 2010 to June 2011, it had an average daily circulation of 12,198. The only paid-for title in Burton-on-Trent, the Mail has been established for more than a century, and prints news from the town and its surrounding area.

Burton Mail is part of Staffordshire Newspapers Limited, a media group which encompasses two daily newspapers, five weekly newspapers, and a selection of magazine titles. The Burton Mail is printed at Cambridge Newspapers Ltd's Milton base.

== History ==
The Burton Mail first appeared on 2 May 1898 as a supporter of the town's Conservative Party. It was set up in competition to the existing Burton Guardian, which in turn represented the views of the Liberal Party. Financial backing for the Burton Mail came from the town's brewery barons, who continued to exert an influence over the newspaper well into the 1970s.

As its rivals fell by the wayside, the Burton Mail flourished, changing its title to the Burton Daily Mail and taking over and incorporating other titles up until 1957, when the Burton Chronicle, the last paid-for opposition title to publish in the town, was bought out and incorporated with the Mail, weekly newspaper, The Burton Observer, to form the Burton Observer and Chronicle. The Burton Daily Mail Ltd had also started publication of the Burton Football Mail in 1946.

The Burton Daily Mail Ltd continued as a trust-operated company until the early 1980s when it was bought out and incorporated into the Birmingham Post and Mail group of titles, then owned by the Iliffe family. In 2012, Local World acquired owner Iliffe News and Media from Yattendon Group.

Published from Monday to Saturday, the Burton Mail changed from being an evening newspaper, on sale around lunchtime, to being a morning publication in 2006, now in the shops at around 6am each day.

In 2012 the Burton Mail became part of the Local World group, formed by David Montgomery, who purchased Northcliffe Media from the Daily Mail and General Trust and, separately, Iliffe News and Media – of which the Burton Mail was part. The purchase of the businesses was approved by the Office of Fair Trading on 28 June 2013.

In November 2015, Trinity Mirror purchased Local World, a major stakeholder in local news titles, from DMGT. Local World had been formed by former Trinity chief exec David Montgomery in 2012 to consolidate all DMGT's local newspaper holdings other than the Metro, expanding their holdings while streamlining production, to make the group more saleable. Its 115 titles are formed primarily by those of Harmsworth's historic Northcliffe Newspapers Group, alongside other smaller purchases made by DMGT and Local World subsequently, including the 2007 purchase from Trinity. The purchase increases Trinity Mirror's local circulation by around 50%. The deal valued Local World at around £220m.

In September 2014, Emma Turton became the first female editor in the newspaper's 116-year history.

In August 2015, the Burton Mail moved from its premises in High Street, Burton, which it had occupied for 98 years, and moved to a site closer to the centre of the town in Worthington Way, Burton.

The Burton Mail was named Newspaper of the Year in November 2017 at the Midlands Media Awards.

Julie Crouch took up the position of editor in December 2017.

In January 2020, the Burton office closed with staff transferred to the Derby Telegraph office in Derby adopting a home/office hybrid model of working. The Derby office was subsequently closed in Summer 2021 with production switched to a regional hub in Nottingham.

Following another round of redundancies by parent company Reach in March 2023, the Burton Mail has no designated editor or editorial staff. https://www.holdthefrontpage.co.uk/2023/news/cuts-leave-daily-with-no-dedicated-staff-and-editor-based-30-miles-away/
