= Bristol Post =

British newspaper

- Type: Five-day-a-week
- Format: Tabloid
- Owner: Reach PLC
- Staff writers: Approx 10
- Founded: 1932; 94 years ago
- Headquarters: Temple Way, Bristol
- Circulation: 17,381 (ABC Feb 2017). Updated circulation figures are unavailable as the publication is no longer registered with the Audit Bureau of Circulations.
- ISSN: 2052-9473
- Website: bristolpost.co.uk

The Bristol Post is a city/regional five-day-a-week (formerly appearing six days per week) newspaper covering news in the city of Bristol, including stories from the whole of Greater Bristol, North Somerset and South Gloucestershire. It was titled the Bristol Evening Post until April 2012. The website was relaunched as BristolLive in April 2018. It is owned by Reach PLC, formerly known as Trinity Mirror.

== History ==
The Evening Post was founded in 1932 by local interests, in response to an agreement between the two national press groups which owned the then two Bristol evening newspapers, Lord Rothermere, owner of the Bristol Evening World, and Baron Camrose, owner of the Bristol Times and Echo. Camrose had agreed to close his Bristol title in return for Rothermere's agreement to close his title in Newcastle, leaving Bristol with just one paper. Readers of the Times and Echo were instrumental in founding the Evening Post, which carried the rubric "The paper all Bristol asked for and helped to create".

The Evening Post and Evening World competed strongly until 1935, when both titles were acquired by a new company, Bristol United Press (BUP), 40% owned by Lord Rothermere's interests and 60% owned by the Bristol Evening Post. In 1960 BUP acquired the Bristol morning paper, the Western Daily Press, and the weekly Bristol Observer. In 1962 the Evening World ceased publication, leaving the Evening Post as Bristol's only evening paper. At that time the paper had a circulation of 160,000.

By 1990 David Sullivan, owner of the Sunday Sport, had acquired an interest in the title, and unsuccessfully sought to acquire more shares. In 1998 Rothermere's Northcliffe Newspaper Group acquired the shares of the independent shareholders in BUP, making the title wholly owned by the Daily Mail and General Trust. In 2006 Northcliffe made 36 staff redundant, and unsuccessfully sought a purchaser for the Bristol Evening Post and Western Daily Press.

In May 2009 it was announced that the Post, and sister paper the Western Daily Press, would no longer be printed in Bristol, but at Northcliffe's central printing unit at Didcot in Oxfordshire. In January 2011 the press hall at its Temple Way headquarters was demolished.

In April 2012 the paper was renamed The Post (reflecting the fact that it has not been printed in the evening for some time) and in May 2012 the Saturday edition was scrapped, with the loss of 20 jobs.

An enhanced Friday edition was subsequently launched, including a magazine, The Weekend.

In 2012, Local World acquired Northcliffe Media from Daily Mail and General Trust.

In October 2015 Trinity Mirror acquired the Bristol Post as part of its takeover of Local World titles.

In March 2018 its editor Mike Norton apologised on the paper's front page for a headline, 'Faces of evil', on the Wednesday 17 April 1996 front page showing 16 photos of black men jailed for dealing crack cocaine, which had led to a large proportion of the city boycotting the paper for many years. Norton wrote:

[...] the problem was one of context.

The Evening Post – as it was called then – was already disconnected from the city's black communities. It was another Bristol institution that the people in those communities didn't feel was for them. They were already wary of telling the Post about their news or their successes. They already had a suspicion that the paper wrote about black people only when they committed crime.

The Faces of Evil front page, with its black faces ranged in rows like slaves held in cages, cemented that view.

== Former journalists ==
- Tom Stoppard (born 1937), playwright and screenwriter
