= Western Daily Press =

Local newspaper published in Bristol

- Type: Daily newspaper
- Format: Tabloid
- Owner: Local World
- Editor: Gavin Thompson
- Staff writers: 6-8 approx
- Founded: 1858
- Political alignment: not stated
- Headquarters: Temple Way, Bristol
- Circulation: 6,095 (as of 2022)
- ISSN: 0307-2738
- Website: somersetlive.co.uk

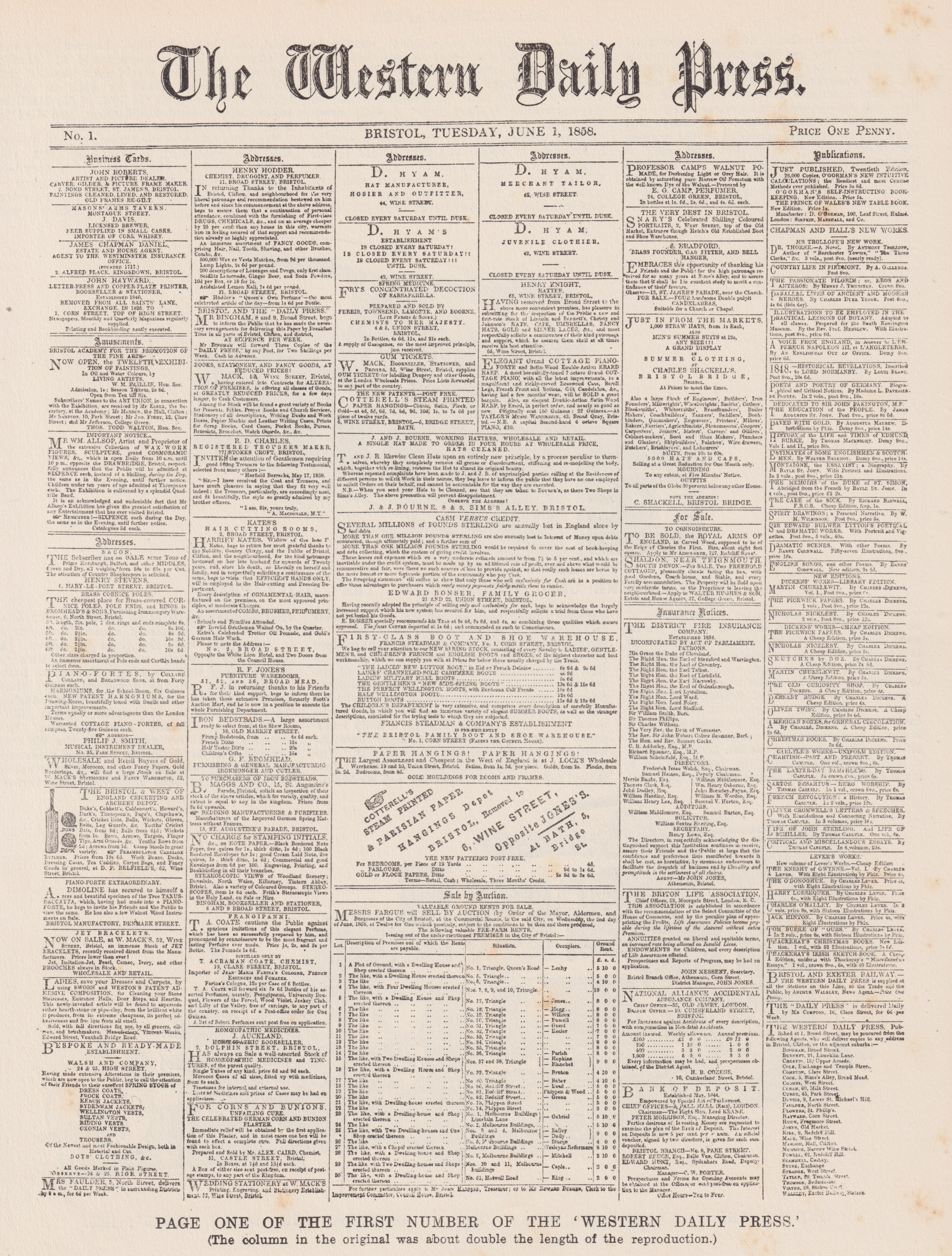
Cover of first edition, 1858

The Western Daily Press is a regional newspaper covering parts of South West England, mainly Gloucestershire, Wiltshire and Somerset as well as the metropolitan areas of Bath and North East Somerset and the Bristol area. It is published Monday to Saturday in Bristol, UK. The majority of its readers are in rural areas, small towns and villages throughout the region and the paper's coverage of rural, agricultural and countryside issues is particularly strong. It also has a good record in picking up quirky and bizarre stories which would otherwise not be publicized. Politically it tends to be conservative although its coverage of the UK ban on fox hunting was neutral, recognizing that even in rural areas people are very divided on the issue.

== Founding ==
It was founded by Scottish businessman Peter Stewart Macliver and Newcastle journalist Walter Reid and first published on 1 June 1858. Macliver went on to found the Bristol Observer. Reid took over the Western Daily Press in 1891 and ran it till the early 20th century.

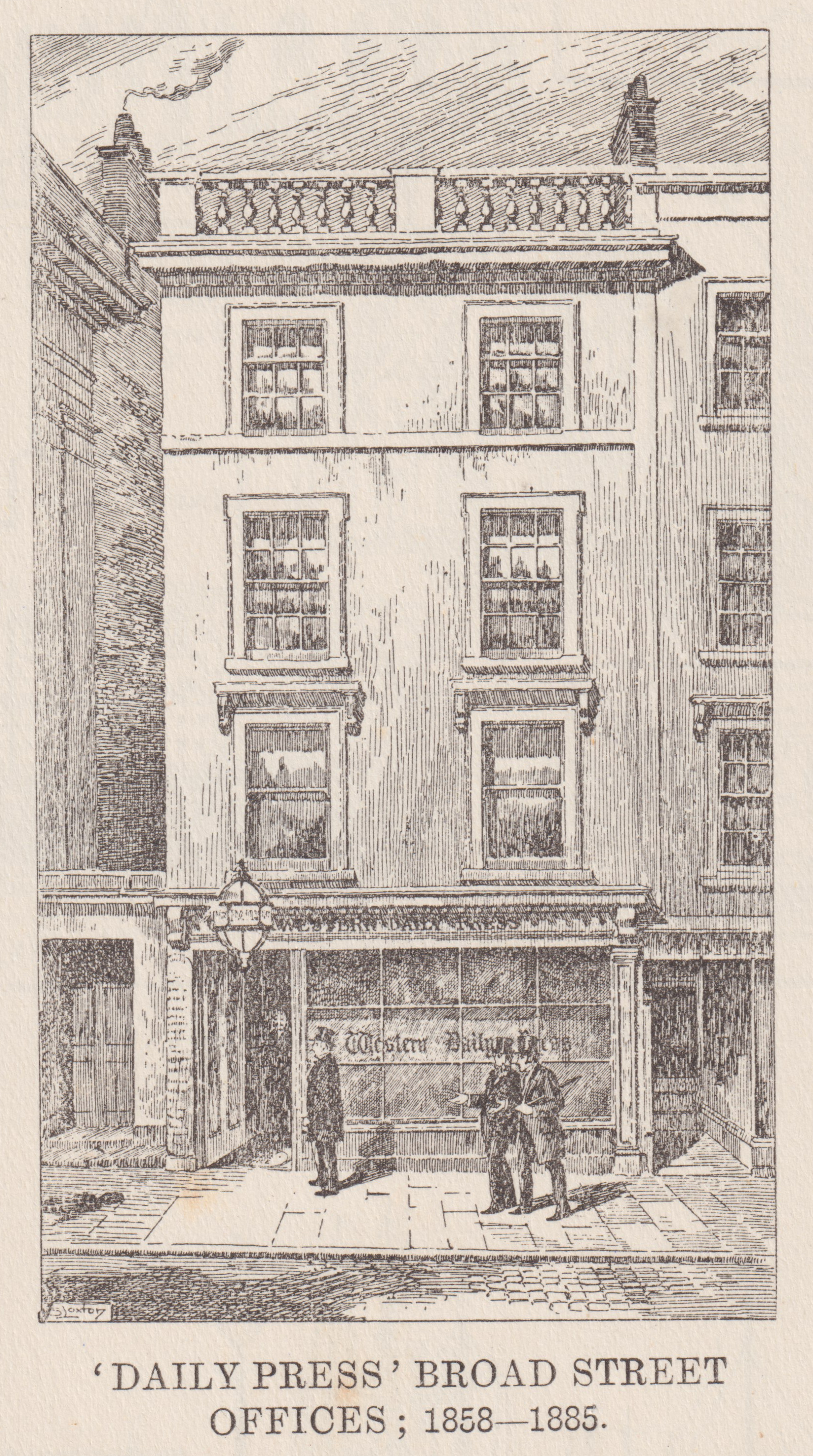
Western Daily Press Office, Broad Street, 1858-1885

== Twentieth century ==
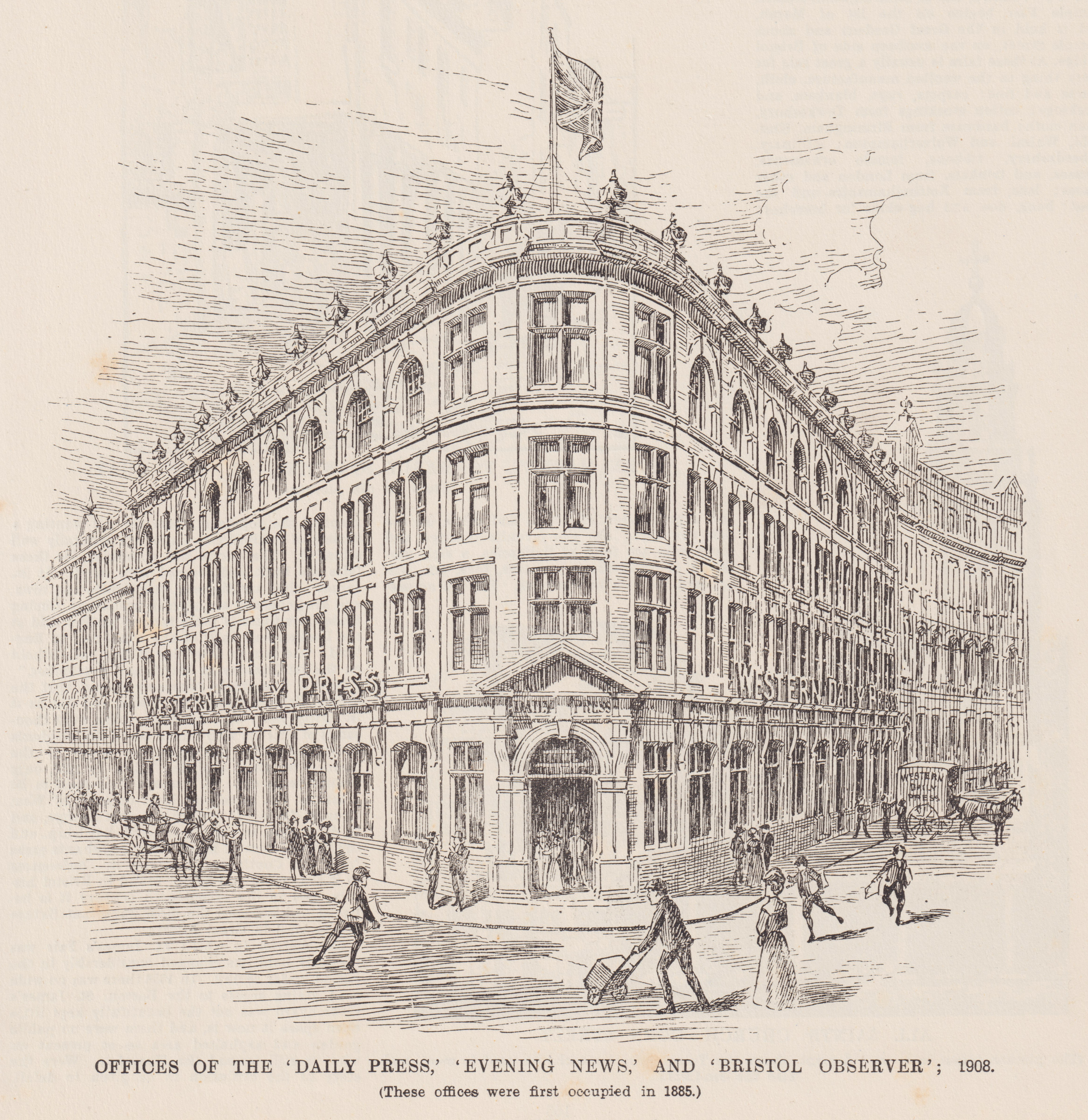
Western Daily Press offices, 1908

The Western Daily was bought by Bristol United Press (BUP), the same company which publishes the Bristol Evening Post, in 1960 and since 1974 has been based at the company's building in Temple Way. BUP was bought in 1999 by the Daily Mail and General Trust, the media conglomerate which also publishes mass-circulation UK tabloid the Daily Mail and became part of its Northcliffe Group of regional newspapers, DMGT previously having owned a minority shareholding. As with most UK titles, the Western Daily Press has been fighting declining newspaper circulation figures in recent years and now sells fewer than 15,000 copies per day. This is a particular problem for the Western Daily Press since its circulation area is very wide and costs of distributing papers and maintaining local journalists are disproportionately high.

== Twenty-first century ==
In 2005 a number of staff were laid off at BUP titles, with management trying to achieve economies through sharing of resources between the different papers. This prompted some Western Daily Press journalists to attempt to auction themselves on eBay as a joke. The National Union of Journalists has been highly critical of these cuts and is particularly active in Bristol; the union says that despite declining circulation the newspapers remain extremely profitable, partly due to advertising revenue, and that the economies are being driven by the unrealistic expectations of shareholders.

== Staff ==
The current editor is Gavin Thompson, succeeding Rob Stokes Previously Tim Dixon was editor from 2010 to 2014, and Andy Wright before him. The newspaper is put together by a small team of multi-skilled journalists known as content editors, working alongside the editor, and a small team of district reporters. The playwright Tom Stoppard started his career as a journalist on the Western Daily Press, and other famous names who have worked for the paper include Sir Terry Pratchett.

== Printing and distribution ==
In May 2009 it was announced that printing of the Press, and sister paper the Bristol Evening Post would be moved to Didcot in Oxfordshire, though the editorial departments are still based in Bristol.

This has led to some distribution timing difficulties owing to the aforementioned wide circulation area and, consequently, supplies to the far South West of the UK have now ceased. In April 2010, it was announced that the editing and sub-editing of the Press would be undertaken in Plymouth and that the publication would undergo a revamp to make it similar in appearance to the Western Morning News which is also edited and sub-edited out of Plymouth. The sale figure has subsequently plummeted.

In May 2010, it was announced that the Western Daily Press would now be published as a single edition, and no longer in two (Somerset/Late City, Bath/Wiltshire/Severnside).

In October 2011 the editorial team returned to its former Bristol base.
