= Kent and Sussex Courier =

English regional newspaper

- Type: Weekly newspaper
- Format: Tabloid
- Publisher: Reach plc
- Language: English
- Headquarters: Royal Tunbridge Wells, Kent
- Circulation: 2,424 (as of 2023)
- Website: kentlive.news

The Kent and Sussex Courier is an English regional newspaper, published in Royal Tunbridge Wells, Kent. The paper was the result of an amalgamation of a number of Kent and East Sussex local newspapers, and hence has always been published in at least two editions, one of which covered the western parts of Kent while the other covered the eastern part of East Sussex.

After its purchase by Northcliffe Newspapers, part of the Daily Mail & General Trust newsgroup, its publishing company was renamed Courier Newspapers. After the 1998 acquisition of Kent & Sussex Radio, and the 2007 acquisition of the Kent regional assets of the Mirror Group, it was renamed the Courier Media Group, part of Northcliffe Media. In 2012, Local World acquired Northcliffe Media from the Daily Mail & General Trust.

The website closed down 30 October 2026

== Newspapers ==
- The Kent and Sussex Courier
- Sevenoaks Chronicle
- Dover Express
- Folkestone Herald
- Isle of Thanet Gazette
