= South West Wales Publications =

South West Wales Publications (SWWP), part of the Northcliffe Media, is a regional newspaper publisher based in Swansea. The company produces eight local and regional paid-for and free titles including the:

- South Wales Evening Post,
- Carmarthen Journal,
- Llanelli Star,
- Swansea Herald of Wales, (until 2011)
- Carmarthen Herald,
- Neath & Port Talbot Tribune,
- West Wales Tribune, and
- The Sporting Post.
