= The Croydon Advertiser =

British newspaper

- Type: Weekly newspaper
- Owner: Reach
- Founder: Jesse Ward
- Founded: 1869
- Circulation: 1,338 (as of 2022)

The Croydon Advertiser (with locally branded editions) is a paid-for weekly newspaper with five editions covering the London Boroughs of Croydon, Sutton and two neighbouring towns and with a free up-to-the-minute maintained web presence.

== History ==
The Croydon newspaper was founded by Jesse Ward in 1869, and it and the other Advertiser publications later became part of the Northcliffe Media Group, which is owned by the Daily Mail and General Trust during its existence the largest newspaper publisher in the United Kingdom. The paper converted from a broadsheet to a compact (tabloid) format on 31 March 2006.

In September 2010 the Advertiser adopted a short-lived hybrid part-paid, part free strategy, with 70,000 copies delivered to homes across Sutton and Croydon.

=== "Lillian's Law" ===
In June 2010, 14-year-old Lillian Groves was killed by a speeding car driver who had been smoking cannabis. Lillian had been in the street outside her New Addington home when she was hit by the car. In August 2011, the Advertiser launched a campaign alongside Lillian's family calling on the Government to reform the law on drug driving.

In November that year Lillian's family met with Prime Minister David Cameron, who promised to introduce new legislation, adding that her death "proved the need for roadside drugs testing" and that the then driving legislation, which relied on police to prove impairment by other means, was "all wrong". In early 2012 the Department for Transport, announced the creation of an expert panel to explore the implications of the new law ("Lillian's Law", as it became known).

In May 2012, a new drug driving offence was included in the Queen's Speech as part of the Crime and Courts Bill, adopted in the Crime and Courts Act 2013. Prime Minister David Cameron credited the campaign and the bravery of the Groves family.

=== Broad ownership ===
In 2012, ownership broadened as a result of a co-venture enterprise Local World between media groups: Daily Mail and General Trust, Yattendon Group, Trinity Mirror and others, taking over Northcliffe Media.

== Editors ==
Current

- Andy Warden

Previous

- David Randall, current night editor of The Independent on Sunday
- Malcolm Starbrook, editor of the East London Advertiser
- Ian Carter, editorial director, Kent Messenger Group.
