= George Pulman =

19th-century English journalist, antiquary, and writer

George Philip Rigney Pulman (1819–1880) was an English journalist, antiquary, and writer on fishing. In 1857 he founded Pulman's Weekly News and Advertiser newspapers.

== Life ==
He was born at Axminster, Devon, on 21 February 1819, the son of Philip Pulman (1791–1871), who married Anne Rigney (1818–1885). Pulman was in early life organist at Axminster parish church and wrote for local newspapers.

In 1848, he acquired a printing and bookselling business at Crewkerne. For some years he was editor of the Yeovil Times, and on 10 March 1857 he set up a paper called Pulman's Weekly News and Advertiser, the first in Crewkerne. For more than twenty years it was both owned and edited by him.

He disposed of his newspaper and business in June 1878, and retired to The Hermitage at Uplyme, between Axminster and Lyme Regis. He died there on 3 February 1880 and was buried at Axminster cemetery on 7 February.

== Works ==
Pulman was a fisherman and won at the Great Exhibition of 1851, a bronze medal for artificial flies. His main work, The Book of the Axe, published in numbers, were published together in 1841 (other editions 1844, 1853, and 1875, the last being rewritten and enlarged). It was a fisherman's description of the district through which the River Axe, noted for trout, flows, and it contained histories of the towns and houses on its banks.

- The Book of the Axe: containing a piscatorial description of that stream, with brief histories of the more remarkable places on its banks, and a variety of tales, songs, and anecdotes. 1841
- --do.--2nd ed. London: Hamilton, Adams, and Co., 1844
- --do.--3rd ed., enlarged. London: Longman, Brown, Green, and Longmans, 1853
- --do.--4th ed., re-written. London: Longman, Green, Reader, and Dyer, 1875
- --do.--reprinted. Bath: Kingsmead Reprints, 1969

Pulman also published

- ‘The Vade-mecum of Fly-fishing for Trout,’ 1841; 2nd edit. 1846, 3rd edit. 1851.
- ‘Rustic Sketches, being Poems on Angling in the Dialect of East Devon,’ Taunton, 1842; reprinted in 1853 and 1871.
- ‘Local Nomenclature. A Lecture on the Names of Places, chiefly in the West of England,’ 1857.
- A version of the ‘Song of Solomon in the East Devonshire Dialect,’ 1860, in collaboration with Prince L. L. Bonaparte.
- ‘Rambles, Roamings, and Recollections, by John Trotandot,’ with portrait, Crewkerne, 1870; this mainly described the country around Crewkerne.
- ‘Roamings abroad by John Trotandot,’ 1878.

Pulman published about 1843 for William Daniel Conybeare ‘The Western Agriculturist: a Farmer's Magazine for Somerset, Dorset, and Devon,’ and the ‘United Counties Miscellany’ from 1849 to July 1851. He supplied the music for songs entitled ‘The Battle of Alma’ (1854) and ‘I'll love my love in the winter,’ with words by W. D. Glyde, and composed a ‘Masonic Hymn’ and ‘Psalms, Hymn-tunes, and twelve Chants’ (1855).

== Family ==
He married at Cattistock, Dorset, on 12 December 1848, Jane, third daughter of George Davy Ewens of Axminster. She survived him with one son, W. G. B. Pulman, a solicitor at Lutterworth.
