= Carmarthen Weekly Reporter =

English liberal newspaper in South Wales (1860-1919)

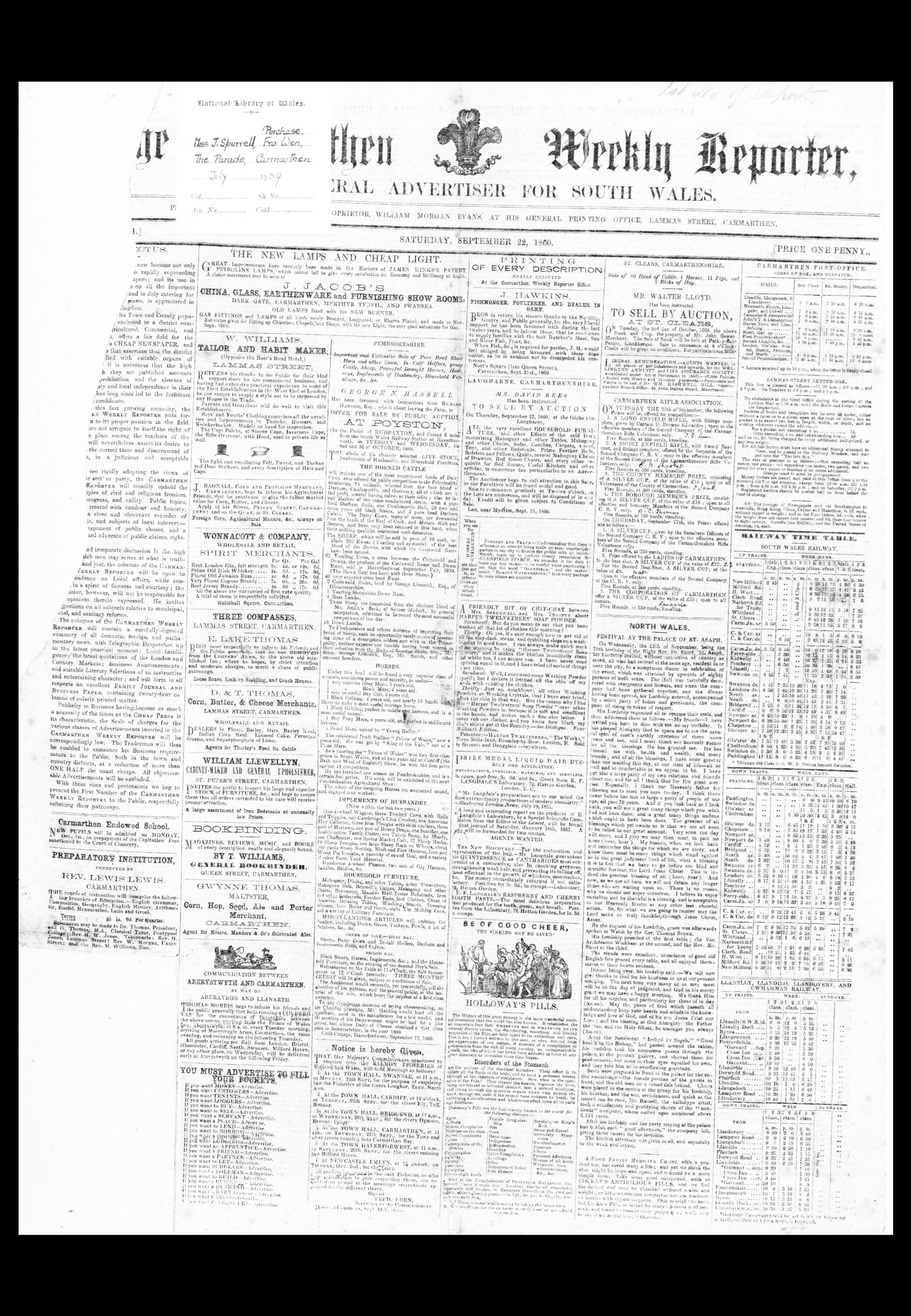
- The Carmarthen weekly reporter:general advertiser for South Wales
- Type: weekly newspaper
- Owner: Edward Joseph (1863; 1871)
- Publisher: William Morgan Evans
- Launched: 22 September 1860
- City: Carmarthen
- Country: Wales
- OCLC number: 750514193

The Carmarthen Weekly Reporter was a weekly liberal, English language newspaper, published in Carmarthen and distributed throughout South Wales. It contained local, national and foreign news, and local information. It was published by William Morgan Evans.

It ceased publication in 1921, partly as a result of competition from the Carmarthen Journal and The Welshman, which were also published in Carmarthen.

Welsh Newspapers Online has digitised 1,840 issues of the Carmarthen Weekly Reporter (1860-1919) from the newspaper holdings of the National Library of Wales.
