= The Herald (Plymouth) =

British newspaper

- Front page of the 3 July 2007 edition
- Type: Daily newspaper
- Format: Tabloid
- Owner: Reach plc
- Editor: Clare Ainsworth
- Founded: 1895
- Headquarters: Plymouth
- Circulation: 2,763 (as of 2024)
- Sister newspapers: Western Morning News; Express & Echo; Herald Express
- Website: plymouthherald.co.uk

The Herald is a Reach plc newspaper serving Plymouth. Its website and social media were rebranded as Plymouth Live in 2018 until 2026 when the branding changed to Plymouth Herald.

== Print and online presence ==
The newspaper's average circulation was 3,872 in the second half of 2023, made up of 2,978 paid-for single issues and 894 paid subscriptions.

The Herald is published six days a week, Monday to Saturday, and has a single edition. It is owned by Reach plc, formerly known as Trinity Mirror.

Its sister titles include the Express & Echo in Exeter, the Herald Express in Torquay and the Western Morning News.

Over 80% of the local adult population in the Plymouth region were said to use The Herald's website in 2013.

In 2018, The Herald's website was rebranded as Plymouth Live by Reach plc.

Its sister websites are Devon Live and Cornwall Live.

Plymouth Live is active on social media, regularly posting breaking news, pictures and videos on its Facebook, Twitter, Instagram, Threads and Bluesky pages.

It has 217,000 followers on Facebook, 81,200 followers on X, 28,000 followers on Instagram, 5,800 followers on Threads and 500 followers on Bluesky.

The Herald's print team is run by editor Claire Ainsworth.

== History ==
The history of the Herald stretches back to 2 pm on Monday 22 April 1895 when the Western Evening Herald was launched as Plymouth's first evening newspaper. Various other newspapers had come and gone in Plymouth in the preceding 100 years. The WEH was published by the owners of the Western Daily Mercury. It was then bought by Sir Leicester Harmsworth in 1921 — a year after he bought the Western Morning News company — and was renamed The Evening Herald and Western Evening News on 17 September 1923. On 24 May 1924, the name was changed again to the Western Evening Herald and Western Evening News.

After changing format to tabloid in 1987, the title changed again to the Evening Herald, becoming simply The Herald in October 2006 when its print deadline shifted from midmorning (between 9 am and 11 am) to 1 am to accommodate the 120-mile distribution journey to Plymouth after printing was transferred to Weymouth in Dorset.

Alan Clark, the Conservative MP for Plymouth Sutton from 1974 to 1992, dismissed the people of Plymouth as "believing everything they read in the Herald".

In 2012, Local World acquired owner Northcliffe Media from Daily Mail and General Trust.
