= Bath Chronicle =

Weekly newspaper in England

- Front cover, 2 October 2014
- Type: Weekly newspaper
- Format: Tabloid
- Owner: Reach plc
- Editor: Emma Slee
- Founded: 1760
- Language: English
- Headquarters: Bath, Somerset
- Circulation: 2,852 (as of 2023)
- ISSN: 1356-0069
- Website: bathchronicle.co.uk

The Bath Chronicle is a weekly newspaper, first published under various titles before 1760 in Bath, England. Prior to September 2007, it was published daily. The Bath Chronicle serves Bath, northern Somerset and west Wiltshire.

== History ==
=== Name changes ===
The Bath Journal was published in 1743, and was renamed Boddely's Bath Journal. It was renamed Keene's Bath Journal in January 1822, and was eventually taken over by the Bath Herald in March 1916. The newspaper also originated from the Bath Chronicle and Universal Register taking over from the Bath Advertiser which was published from 1755.

By 1919 it had changed its name to the Bath and Wilts Chronicle as a result of a merger with another paper. The Bath Herald was merged with the Bath Chronicle in 1925 to become the Bath Chronicle and Herald, amended in 1936 to Bath Weekly Chronicle and Herald.

The early 1960s was a time for another minor name change to Bath and Wilts Evening Chronicle. The change took place with the issue of 12 June 1961, but was again changed, with the issue of 1 April 1974 to Bath and West Evening Chronicle, before changing to the Evening Chronicle with the issue of 3 January 1989, remaining with that title until 7 May 1994.

In October 2007, the Bath Chronicle switched from daily to weekly publication, every Thursday.

The paper celebrated its 250th anniversary in October 2010, publishing a special supplement to mark the occasion.

In March 2018, Trinity Mirror's Somerset Live platform began to operate the Bath Chronicle website. In November 2018, Bath Chronicle staff moved from their office of 10 years to space in neighbouring Bath College.

=== Ownership ===
In 2012, Local World acquired owner Northcliffe Media from Daily Mail and General Trust. It is published as part of the Bath Newspapers Group. Its circulation reaches the population of Bath and the surrounding areas including parts of Wiltshire and Somerset.

In November 2015, Trinity Mirror took over Local World in a £220 million deal.

=== Associated publications ===
A series of weekly supplements included the Property Chronicle, the Bath Observer and the Norton Radstock & Frome Observer. The Observer supplements ceased publication in 2008.

== Archives ==
Bath Record Office hold many issues of local titles. Their Georgian Newspaper Project, completed c.2005, provides an index to selected Bath Chronicle editions between 1770 and 1799.
