= The Welshman (newspaper) =

Newspaper

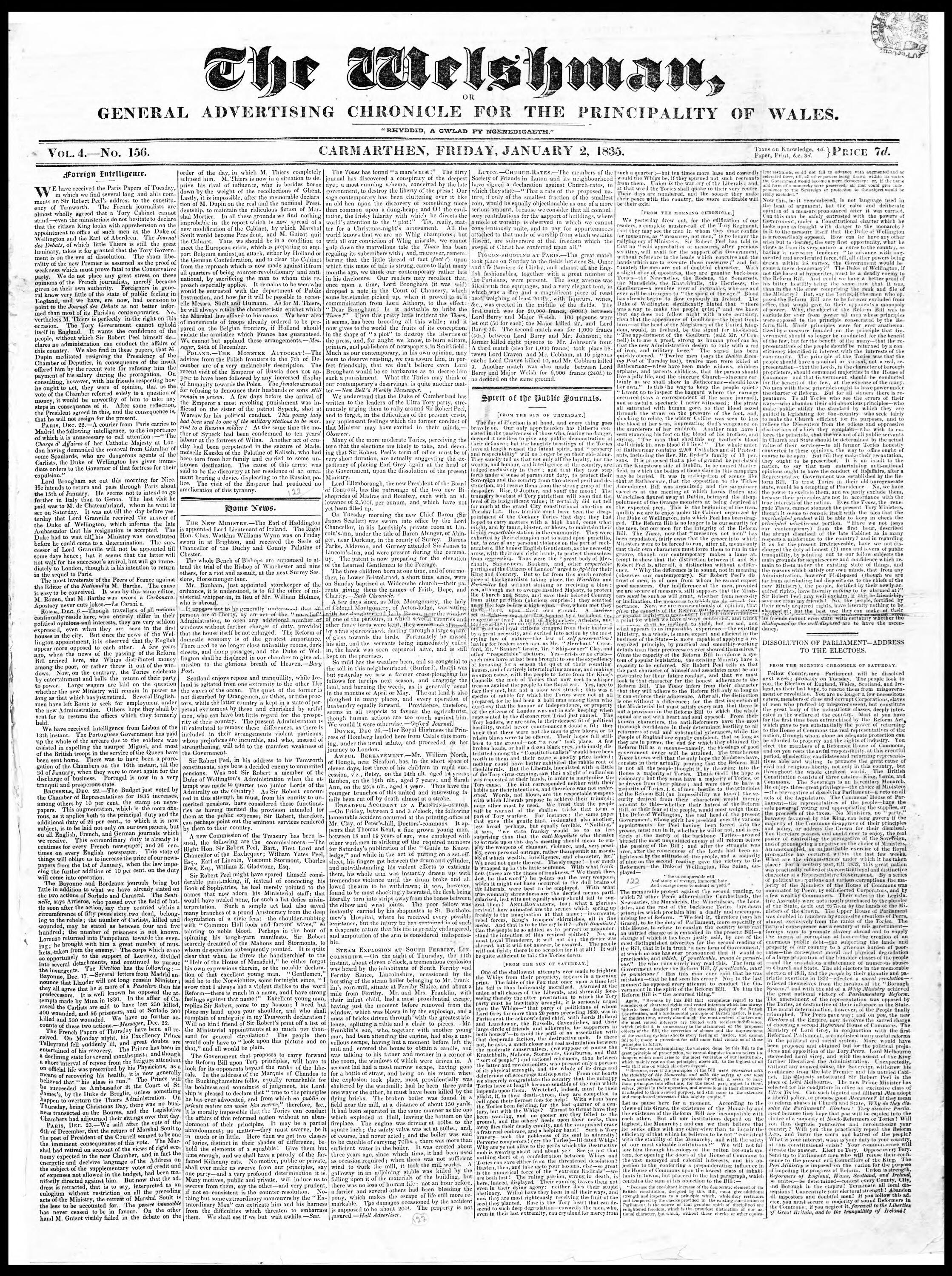
- The Welshman; or general advertising chronicle for the Principality of Wales
- Type: weekly newspaper
- Owner(s): Joseph Hegginbottom (1845; 1861), William James Morgan, Daniel Jones
- Publisher: Joseph Hegginbottom, William James Morgan
- Launched: 13 January 1832
- City: Carmarthen
- Country: Wales
- OCLC number: 52192945

The Welshman (established in 1832) was a weekly 'radical' English language Welsh newspaper, reporting local and national news and information. It was published in Carmarthen and distributed in the Cardiganshire area and through much of South Wales.

From 1840 to 1942 it was known as The Welshman and general advertiser for the Principality of Wales, reverting to its original name in 1942.

In the late 1940s the paper was bought by the owners of the Carmarthen Journal . The Welshman ceased publication in 1984.

There are 2,032 issues of the paper (from 1835 to 1910) free online at the National Library of Wales.
