= Torquay Herald Express =

English local newspaper

Herald Express
- Type: Weekly newspaper
- Format: Tabloid/compact
- Owner: Reach plc
- Founded: 13 July 1925
- Circulation: 3,193 (as of 2023)
- Website: devonlive.com

The Herald Express is a local newspaper covering the Torbay area of the United Kingdom. It is published by Reach plc. It serves a wide surrounding area of coastal and inland communities in South Devon, which attracts millions of tourists each year to swell its 100,000-plus resident population.

== History ==
The Herald Express was born out of the rivalry between two evening papers, each of which produced local editions for Torbay—an area which includes Torquay, Paignton and Brixham—and first appeared in its own right as a title on Monday, 13 July 1925, when the two decided to amalgamate.

Devon's premier publishing centres had always been at Plymouth, where Sir Leicester Harmsworth, brother of newspaper baron Lord Northcliffe, controlled the city's Evening Herald, and at Exeter, where Sir James Owen had the county's other evening title, the Express and Echo.

First into Torquay had been the Exeter-sponsored Torbay Express and South Devon Echo in 1921, followed shortly afterwards by the Plymouth-controlled Torbay Herald. The latter was produced in Braddons Hill Road West, the former nearby in Union Street.

The competition was intense and Torquay of the day did not have the commercial output to support two evening titles. Eventually the papers merged, Harmsworth having acquired his rival, to become the Torbay Herald and Express, and printed in Braddons Hill Road West. Later this was simplified to Herald Express.

It has had the distinction of being based in Fleet Street, for the front entrance and office of the Braddons Hill works was nearby in Torquay's main shopping thoroughfare.

It was not until July 1980 that the paper moved to custom-built headquarters on the northern edge of the town. Throughout the years since its founding, the Herald Express has been closely linked with its Exeter sister paper within the Western Times Company and the Northcliffe Group. However, in 1991 it became a new and independent operating company in its own right within Northcliffe as Herald Express Publications Ltd. During its lifetime, it has had nine editors, including the present incumbent, Jim Parker.

In March 1996, Northcliffe Newspapers Group restructured its publishing interests in the South West of England. This involved the appointment of a new regional management team to direct the operations of Northcliffe's daily newspaper centres at Plymouth, Exeter and Torquay.

Following many changes in the structure of the Torquay operation, the Herald Express printing press was closed in November 1996. The head office in Barton Hill Road retained its existing editorial, advertising and newspaper sales departments, but from then on the paper was to be printed at the Western Morning News building in Plymouth.

In June 2011 it was announced that it would become a weekly publication from Thursday 21 July 2011 with the loss of around 16 members (half) of the editorial staff.

In 2012, Local World acquired owner Northcliffe Media from Daily Mail and General Trust. Local World was subsequently acquired by Trinity Mirror which rebranded as Reach plc in 2018.
