= Bridgwater Times =

Former English weekly newspaper

- Type: weekly
- Format: tabloid
- Owner: Northcliffe Media
- Language: English
- Circulation: 26,117
- Price: free

The Bridgwater Times was a free weekly newspaper, for Bridgwater, Somerset, England.

It was owned by Northcliffe Media, part of the Daily Mail and General Trust newsgroup. It closed in 2011.
