= Retford Times =

Newspaper

- Type: Weekly newspaper
- Owner(s): Reach plc
- Founded: 1869
- Circulation: 573 (as of 2024)
- Website: lincolnshirelive.co.uk/all-about/retford

The Retford Times is a weekly local newspaper founded in 1869. It is distributed in and around the area of the North Nottinghamshire market town of Retford. The newspaper contains local news and views from resident people as well as a property section for Retford and the surrounding villages. The Retford Times is headquartered at a recently completed structure on West Street. They moved from their former offices on Chancery Lane where they were based since 1928. In 2012, Local World acquired owner Northcliffe Media from Daily Mail and General Trust.

== See also ==
- Retford
