= Burnham and Highbridge Times =

- Type: Weekly
- Format: Tabloid
- Owner(s): Northcliffe Media
- Language: English
- Circulation: 12,919
- Price: free

The Burnham and Highbridge Times was a newspaper, published in Somerset, England.

It was a free weekly for Burnham-on-Sea, Highbridge and outlying communities.

It was owned by Northcliffe Media, part of the Daily Mail and General Trust newsgroup. It closed in 2010.
