= Kenton, Devon =

Village in Devon, England

Coordinates: 50.64°N 3.47°W

Kenton
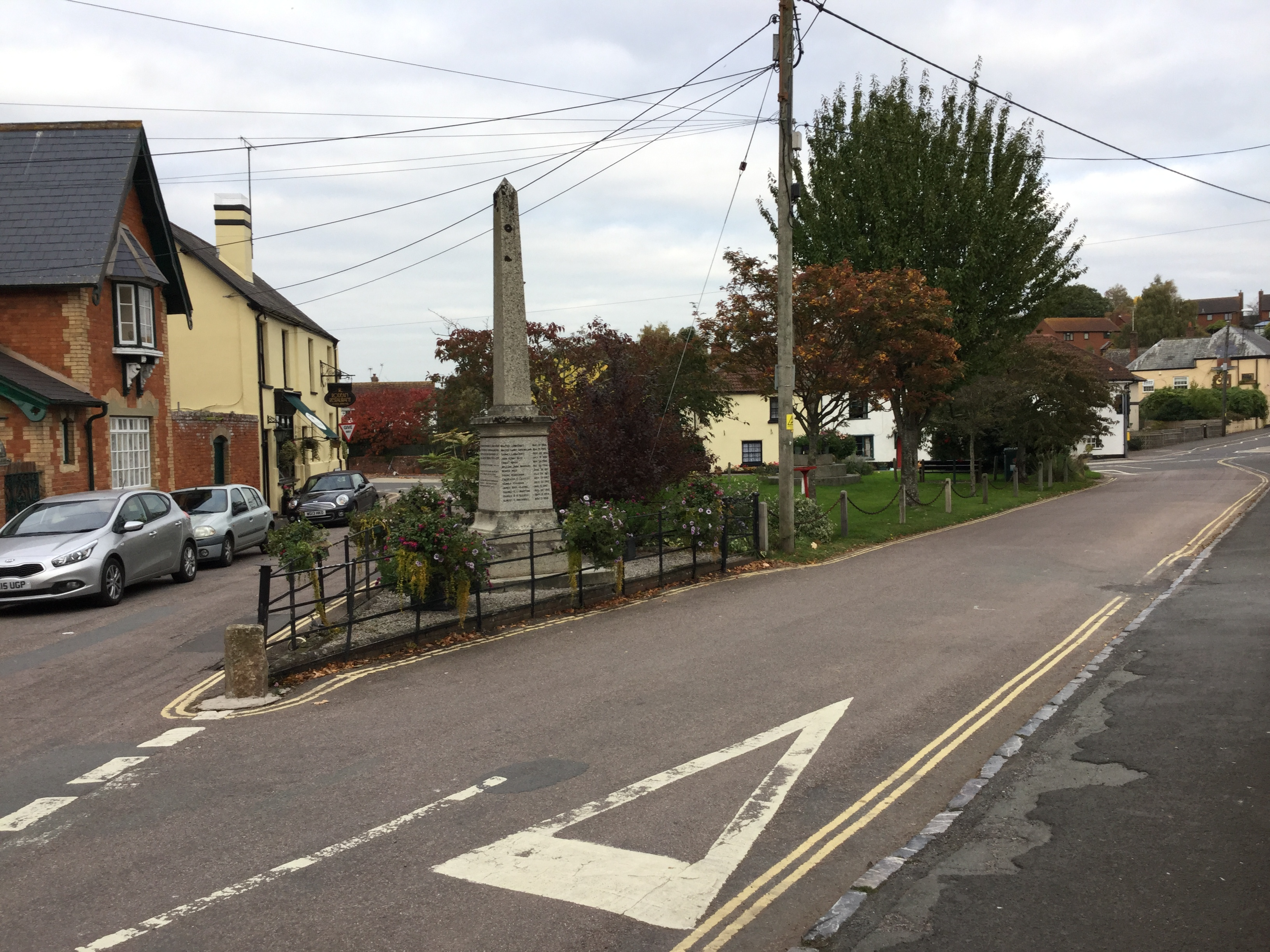

- Location within Devon
- Population: 1,042 (2021)
- Civil parish: Kenton
- District: Teignbridge
- Shire county: Devon
- Region: South West
- Country: England
- Sovereign state: United Kingdom
- Post town: EXETER
- Postcode district: EX6
- Dialling code: 01626
- Police: Devon and Cornwall
- Fire: Devon and Somerset
- Ambulance: South Western
- UK Parliament: Teignbridge

Kenton is a village and civil parish in the Teignbridge district, near Exeter, the county town of Devon, England. It has one restaurant, a primary school, a mediaeval church and is near Powderham Castle. In 2021 the parish had a population of 1042.

The centre of the village was rebuilt in brick immediately after a fire on 16 April 1856 which destroyed 24 dwellings.

The 14th-century All Saints Church is built of red sandstone with arcades of Beer stone. John Betjeman judged it to be "the full-aisled Devon plan at its best", with a "handsome" tower, and praised the rood screen, which retains ancient colour, and the figure-paintings. The pulpit is medieval; the reredos is by Charles Eamer Kempe.

Exeter's first woman councillor, Edith Splatt, was born here.

The tower clock, installed in 1900, chimes on the hours and the quarters throughout the day and night; in 2021 it was muffled when Teignbridge Council determined that it exceeded legally permitted noise levels. The adjacent almshouses were built in 1875.

== Twin towns ==
- Saint-Lambert-du-Lattay (France) since 1996
- Linkebeek (Belgium) since 1996
