= Yeovil Times =

Free weekly newspaper published and distributed in South Somerset

- Type: Weekly newspaper
- Format: Tabloid
- Owner: Northcliffe Media
- Ceased publication: 6 November 2011
- Language: English
- Circulation: 27,046

The Yeovil Times was a free weekly newspaper, published and distributed in South Somerset (which includes the town of Yeovil), in association with the Western Gazette. It was owned by Northcliffe Media, then part of the Daily Mail and General Trust newsgroup. Its content was largely based on local issues. The last issue was published on 6 November 2011.
