= Gloucester Citizen =

Local weekly newspaper

The Citizen
- Type: Weekly (from 12 October 2017) newspaper, formerly six-day-a-week
- Owner: Reach plc
- Publisher: Gloucestershire Media
- Headquarters: Gloucester, England
- Circulation: 2,614 (as of 2023)
- Website: gloucestershirelive.co.uk

The former logo of The Citizen.

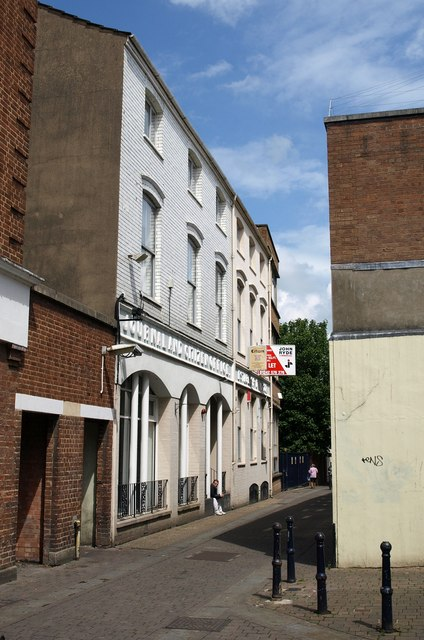
The former offices of The Citizen, Gloucester.

The Gloucester Citizen is a local British weekly newspaper covering the areas of Gloucester, Stroud and the Forest of Dean. It was a six-day-a-week newspaper until it went weekly in October 2017. The Gloucester Citizen is headquartered at Gloucester Quays along with its sister newspaper the Gloucestershire Echo. The editor from 2017 to 2020 was Rachael Sugden.

== History ==
The newspaper was originally founded on 9 April 1722 as The Gloucester Journal. The Citizen first appeared on 1 May 1876, published by local businessman and future mayor Samuel Bland. The Citizen and Journal merged on 1 January 1879.

== Editions ==
The Gloucester Citizen is a former daily (six days per week) newspaper which went weekly from the October 12, 2017 issue, publishing on Thursdays. Before the changed frequency, it had a Saturday edition containing the Weekend magazine. There was also a Forest of Dean edition of the newspaper which was released on a Wednesday. The Pink 'Un, focusing on the sport side of the county, was a supplement which came out each Monday with the newspaper and Citizen People focusing on the individual local communities also releases on Monday.

== Ownership ==
The newspaper was purchased by Northcliffe Media in 1928. In 2012, Local World acquired owner Northcliffe Media from Daily Mail and General Trust. In 2015, Trinity Mirror bought Local World's newspapers and online services.

== See also ==
- Gloucestershire Echo, a sister paper for the Cheltenham area.
