= The West Briton =

English local newspaper, covering Cornwall

- Type: Weekly newspaper
- Format: Tabloid
- Owner: Reach PLC
- Founded: 1810
- Headquarters: Truro, Cornwall
- Circulation: 3,744 (as of 2023)
- Website: www.westbriton.co.uk

The West Briton is a local weekly newspaper published every Thursday. It serves various areas of Cornwall in the United Kingdom: there are four separate editions – Truro and mid-Cornwall; Falmouth and Penryn; Redruth, Camborne and Hayle; and Helston and The Lizard. It was established in 1810 and is part of the Cornwall & Devon Media group of companies. It is based in Truro.

Weekly circulation was 30,700 as of 29 August 2012, down 1,687 copies – or 5.2% – when compared to figures for March of the same year.

In 2012, Local World acquired Cornwall & Devon Media owner Northcliffe Media from Daily Mail and General Trust. In October 2015, Trinity Mirror (now Reach plc) reached agreement with Local World's other shareholders to buy the company.

== Content ==
Each of The West Briton's editions contains news relating to its area of Cornwall; for example the Falmouth and Penryn edition has the local news for these towns. The paper also prints the news concerning all of Cornwall. There are announcements printed in the paper, including birthdays, marriages and deaths. The back pages contain local sport, with information on local sporting activities and leagues.

The paper comes with several pull-out sections. A motors supplement has new and used cars for sale, a property section has houses for sale and rent, the classified section has local businesses and items for sale by readers and a what's on section contains entertainment in Cornwall, such as theatre and cinema listings.
