= Edith Splatt =

British dressmaker, journalist and politician (1873–1945)

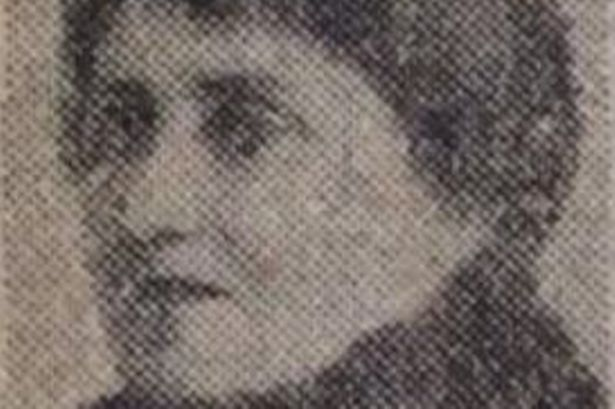
- Born: 3 January 1873; Kenton
- Died: 3 June 1945 (aged 72); Exeter

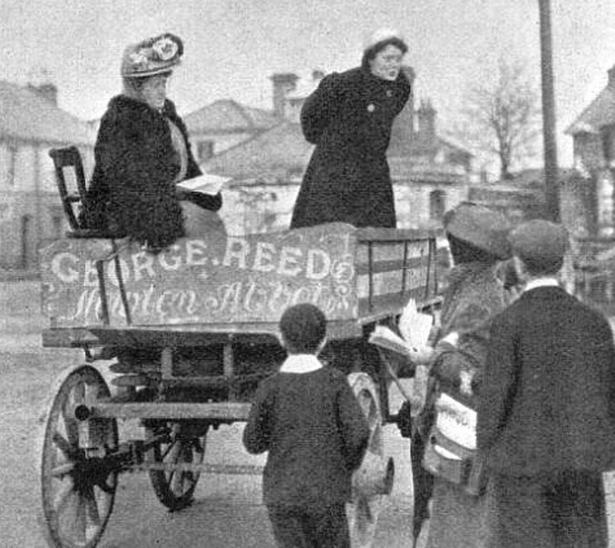
The WSPU campaign in Newton Abbot in 1908 showing Nellie Martel and Mary Gawthorpe

Edith Splatt (3 January 1873 – 3 June 1945) was a British dressmaker, journalist and later an Exeter councillor. She led a tram protest and campaigned for better housing. She was a suffragette in the Women's Social and Political Union (WSPU) and a committee member of the less militant National Union of Women's Suffrage Societies (NUWSS).

== Life ==
Splatt was born in 1873 when her family were living in a large farm near the Devon village of Kenton. Her father died in the 1890s and the family sold up and moved away. She, her mother, and her hat-making younger sister were living in Exeter in 1901 when Edith was a dressmaker. She had been a dressmaker then for at least ten years and she would create made to measure dresses for fashion conscious clients

In 1909 she was creating a column titled "Womanland" for Exeter's Express and Echo. "Womanland" dealt with various topics including suffrage protests. Splatt is thought to be the anonymous author who wrote an account of a suffrage protest the year before in Hyde Park. In 1911 it is presumed that she was living with her mother at 33 Herschell Road in Exeter but she does not appear on the national census that year. Many suffragettes refused to complete census forms as a protest because they did not have a vote.

She is recorded in 1915 as having mounted a one-women campaign, two or three years previously, to enable women to purchase reduced-price workman’s tickets when travelling on Exeter trams.

In 1915 she was a journalist creating serialised stories for the local paper; and by 1921 is referred to as 'a well-known local journalist'.

She became one of the first women (alongside Mrs W. Browne) to be elected to Exeter council, for Belmont Ward in November 1921, and held a seat on the council until her death in 1945. She and fellow councillor Florence Browne served on committees concerning welfare and this has been criticised for allowing themselves to be "pigeon holed".

== Death and legacy ==
Splatt died at Herschell Road in Exeter, in 1945. A blue plaque was put up on her house in Exeter recording her service to the city.
