= Medway News =

Weekly newspaper in the Medway Towns, Kent, England

- Company type: Newspaper
- Industry: Publishing
- Founded: 1855 (as Military Chronicle and Naval Spectator)
- Defunct: 8 December 2011
- Fate: Closed following failed takeover
- Successor: Medway Messenger
- Headquarters: Gillingham Business Park (2008-2011)
- Area served: Medway Towns, Kent, England
- Key people: Christine Rayner (Editor)
- Products: Weekly newspaper
- Parent: Iliffe Media Group (April 2017 - Present); KM Media Group (1890 - April 2017)

The Medway News was a weekly newspaper covering the Medway Towns in Kent, England. Established in 1855 as the Military Chronicle and Naval Spectator, it relaunched as the Chatham News and Rochester, Strood, Brompton & Gillingham Advertiser on Saturday 9 July 1859. The first issue cost 1d. The final issue was published on 8 December 2011.

The newspaper was known as the Chatham News, the Medway News and just the News but held the title Rochester, Chatham and Gillingham News (often known as the Roch-Chat-Gill) for the longest period.

Until late 2008 it was published from offices in New Road Avenue, Chatham, and was one of a series of newspapers that included the Medway Standard and the free Medway Adscene. However, the Standard ceased publication in early 2009 when the Adscene title was absorbed into the News, "Medway" was dropped from the titlepiece and the publication day was shifted from Friday to Thursday.

The newspaper's offices moved from the centre of Chatham to Gillingham Business Park and were shared with the News's sister paper, the East Kent Gazette, which had been based on the same site in Sittingbourne since its foundation on 21 July 1855. Both titles were then edited by Christine Rayner, editor of the East Kent Gazette since 1995.

The News featured general news, a leisure section, a business page, a film review, comment, village news and sport. The Medway Standard, specialised in sports news, particularly coverage of Gillingham Football Club.

Previous reporters at the newspaper include Martin Brunt, now crime correspondent for Sky News, Peter Salmon, later controller of BBC One, Robert Tyrer, later associate editor of The Sunday Times, and John Williams, a political editor at The Daily Mirror and the London Evening Standard, and author of a draft of the September Dossier for war in Iraq.

The editor until its closure was Christine Rayner, the news editor Nicola Jordan, and the sports editor Lance Morgan.

The News was part of Kent Regional News and Media, owned since July 2007 by Northcliffe Media. Other titles in KRNM included the East Kent Gazette (which published its last edition on 7 December 2011) the Whitstable Times, Herne Bay Times, Isle of Thanet Gazette, Thanet Times, Folkestone Herald and Dover Express.

Northcliffe announced closure of the News just a fortnight after a failed takeover by the rival Kent Messenger Group, which would have seen the KRNM titles subsumed into the KM portfolio. KRNM bosses blamed the Office of Fair Trading for halting the deal. The office referred the newspaper deal to the Competition Commission, because of the possible monopoly it might create. This meant the cost of the deal and process of takeover would have increased.

The last edition of the News was published on Thursday 8 December 2011, a day after the final Gazette. Northcliffe had intended to cease publication a week earlier but the editor and staff asked to publish a farewell souvenir issue looking back over the News's 156 years.

== History ==
Editors of the News
1859	Joseph Clayton
1859	Henry Foster
1885	George Neves
1921	C P Wootton
1923	H J Ross
1927	Harry Couchman
1950	Eddie Albon
1959	Graham Parrett
1968	Eric Wintle
1970	Gerald Hinks
1993	Jon McElhill
1995	Murray Evans
2001	Diane Nicholls
2008	Christine Rayner

The first editor-proprietor of the News was Joseph Clayton, a bookseller, who soon discovered he needed a journalist, and brought in Henry Foster from The Spectator.

Foster eventually became sole proprietor. When he died in 1885 his heirs sold to Parrett & Neves, publishers of the East Kent Gazette at Sittingbourne, George Neves becoming editor. He died in 1921.

Neves was succeeded C. P. Wootton, H. J. Ross, Harry Couchman, and Eddie Albon. In 1959, Graham Parrett – great-grandson of W. J. Parrett, whose company bought the News in 1885 – became editor until 1968 when he became managing director of Parrett & Neves' publishing company, Associated Kent Newspapers. His deputy Eric Wintle was promoted to editor and stayed in that role briefly (he later became the company's editorial director) before Gerald Hinks took the editor's chair in 1970. Hinks, a former editor of the Sheerness Times Guardian and East Kent Gazette, took the News and its sister paper the Chatham Standard through an era of great success and won many national newspaper awards. His editorship, characterised by a string of exclusive stories and robust journalism, was marred by the closure of Chatham Dockyard in 1984, an event that caused huge social change, severe depression to the Medway towns' fortunes, and a drop in the circulation of the News. Staff during this time include Michael Pearce, later editor of the Isle of Thanet Gazette and Thanet Times, Frank Dunkley, Jimmy Hodge, Ted Connolly and Christine Rayner, since 1995 editor of the East Kent Gazette series and editor of the News since 2008.

In 1988 Parrett & Neves sold Associated Kent Newspapers to Emap. During this ownership, Hinks was replaced by Jon McElhill, formerly of the Mid-Sussex Times. The group was subsequently sold to its rivals, the Canterbury-based freesheet publishing group Adscene. McElhill was succeeded by Murray Evans, a former deputy editor of the News and editor of the East Kent Gazette. Evans was succeeded in 2001 by his deputy, Diane Nicholls and she in turn by Christine Rayner. The publishing group went through three more owners, Denitz and Southnews and Trinity Mirror. Northcliffe Media bought Trinity's Kent titles, including the News, in July 2007.

== The News office ==
The News was initially published and printed at 30 High Street, Chatham. In the late 1960s, after printing and production was centralised at Crown Quay Lane, Sittingbourne, the building was sold to the BBC, from which BBC Radio Medway was launched in 1970. (More recently the building was converted into flats, and named Media House in view of its previous uses.) The News moved to a nearby building at 12 New Road Avenue, Chatham. A Rochester branch office, in the High Street near the Cathedral Green, closed in the early 1960s; the Gillingham branch office shut two decades later.

In summer 2008 it was announced the New Road Avenue office would shut and the News would move to Gillingham Business park, sharing an office with its older sister paper, the East Kent Gazette.

== Sources ==
- Company records of Parrett & Neves
- Kelly's Directory of Rochester, Chatham, Gillingham and Strood
