= Taunton Times =

- Type: Weekly
- Format: tabloid
- Owner(s): Northcliffe Media
- Founded: 1998
- Language: English
- Ceased publication: 2006
- Price: Free

The Taunton Times was a free weekly newspaper, in Taunton, Somerset, England.

It was owned by Northcliffe Media, part of the Daily Mail and General Trust newsgroup and ran from 1998 before it ceased publication in November 2006. Northcliffe claimed the award-winning paper was not making enough money.
