= Hertfordshire Mercury =

Newspaper in the United Kingdom

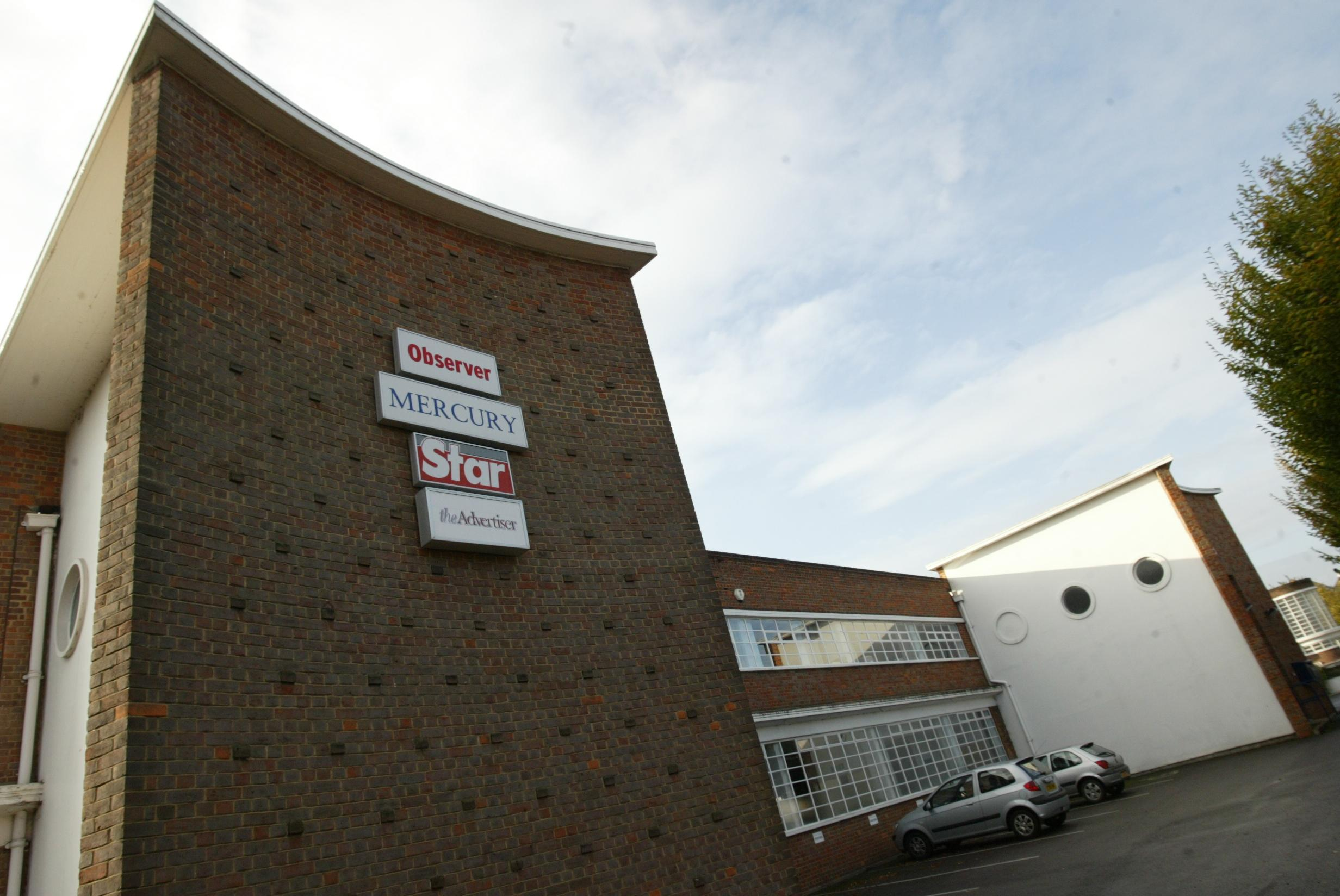
- Type: Weekly newspaper
- Format: Tabloid
- Owner: Local World
- Publisher: Local World
- Editor-in-chief: Julie Palmer
- Language: English
- Headquarters: Hertford, Herts
- Circulation: 1,891 (as of 2022)
- Website: www.hertfordshiremercury.co.uk

The Hertfordshire Mercury is a weekly newspaper covering east and north Hertfordshire and parts of west Essex. It was founded in 1772 as the Hartford Mercury.

For a long time the paper was based at Fore Street in Hertford. It has moved to the Media Centre in Ware Road, Hertford and is printed by Cambridge Newspapers in Cambridge. It is part of Herts and Essex Newspapers which is owned by Local World. The editor is Julie Palmer.

== Editions ==
It used to be published every Friday but from December 3, 2009, its publication day switched to Thursdays.

The Mercury has four editions. The main edition, called the Hertfordshire Mercury, covers Hertford, Ware and neighbouring villages in East Herts. The Hoddesdon and Broxbourne Mercury covers the northern part of Broxbourne borough, plus the Essex villages of Nazeing and Roydon. The Cheshunt and Waltham Mercury covers the southern part of Broxbourne borough, including Waltham Cross, plus Waltham Abbey in Essex. The Buntingford and Royston Mercury covers areas of east and north Herts.
