= Nottingham Post =

Regional daily tabloid newspaper serving Nottinghamshire, England

- Type: Daily newspaper
- Format: Tabloid
- Owner: Reach plc
- Editor: Natalie Fahy
- Founded: 1878
- Headquarters: Castle Gate, Nottingham
- Circulation: 2,553 (as of Jan-Jun 2025)
- Website: nottinghampost.com

The Nottingham Post (formerly the Nottingham Evening Post) is an English tabloid newspaper which serves Nottingham, Nottinghamshire and parts of Derbyshire, Leicestershire and Lincolnshire.

The Post is published Monday to Saturday each week, and was also available via online subscription until 10 March 2020. In the first six months of 2024, the paper had a daily circulation of 3,487, down 23.7% on the same period in 2023.

== History ==
The first edition of The Evening Post was printed by Thomas Forman on 1 May 1878. It sold for ½d and consisted of four pages.

In July 1963, the Post's main competitor, the Nottingham Evening News, closed and merged with the Post. Also, the city’s two morning papers, the Nottingham Guardian and the Nottingham Journal, were merged into The Guardian Journal. On 19 June 1973, a printing dispute began, causing a period of industrial turmoil in the company, and The Guardian Journal ceased publication on that day. During the protracted dispute, some Post journalists launched their own newspaper, receiving moral support from Brian Clough, then manager of Nottingham Forest. Eventually, as the only remaining newspaper was the Nottingham Evening Post, which increasingly covered the whole day’s news, it was re-named the Nottingham Post from the beginning of July 2010.

One of the Post's stalwart journalists, Emrys Bryson, wrote a revue about Nottingham life called Owd Yer Tight, which ran at Nottingham's Theatre Royal. The Post's sister paper, the Nottinghamshire Weekly Guardian, published D. H. Lawrence's first short story.

In March 1996 the Post was relaunched as a full-colour tabloid, although the Saturday edition had switched to the smaller paper size as far back as 1982.

Occasionally the newspaper includes special features which focus on a particular aspect of life in Nottingham. An example of this was the paper's Muslims in Nottingham series in April 2007. This consisted of a week-long series of interviews and articles in both the newspaper and on the Evening Post website. They focused on Nottingham's Muslim community, giving its members the opportunity to express their views of life in the city.

The Post was based at offices on Forman Street in the centre of Nottingham until 1998 when the paper relocated to Castle Wharf House. It moved to Tollhouse Hill in the city centre in 2012. In October 2011 printing moved from Derby to Birmingham.

In 2012, Local World acquired the paper's owner Northcliffe Media from Daily Mail and General Trust.

The newspaper's owner, Reach PLC, closed the Post's City Gate offices in March 2022, meaning that the Nottingham Post's remaining journalists all worked from home and the company no longer had a newsroom base in the East Midlands. A new office for the paper then opened in September 2023 on Castle Gate in the centre of Nottingham.

In August 2025, the Reform UK leadership of Nottinghamshire County Council banned the newspaper's reporters from speaking to the council leader or any of the party's councillors, following "a disagreement about a story it ran on local government reorganisation" according to BBC News. The authority also declared it would no longer send press releases to the paper, or invite them to council-run events. In response, senior editor Natalie Fahy called it "a direct attack on the free press and our ability to hold elected members to account", and a petition against the move gathered over 25,000 signatures (as of 1 September 2025).

== Other publications ==
As well as the main newspaper, the Post also published a weekly sports paper on a Saturday throughout the football season, The Football Post (no longer published) which included coverage of the two local Football League clubs, Nottingham Forest and Notts County, as well as coverage of local non-league football, cricket, ice hockey and rugby union. In addition to this, the Post also previously published Forest Fever, a weekly newspaper-style magazine dedicated to Nottingham Forest Football Club. Its weekly in-depth look at events at the City Ground featured interviews with players, former players, management and supporters.

There is also a monthly Bygones paper (no longer published as a separate publication), which publishes features and stories on the history of Nottingham.

== Editors ==
1. Jesse Forman (1878–1892)
2. Richard Kerr (December 1892 – 1900)
3. Alfred Smith (1900–1924)
4. Frank Pointon (1924–1946)
5. F. T. Hartlett (1946–1963)
6. Keith Burnett (1963–1969)
7. William Snaith (1969–1982)
8. Barrie Williams (1982–1995)
9. Graham Glen (1995–2006)
10. Malcolm Pheby (2006–2012)
11. Mel Cook (2012)
12. Mike Sassi (2013–2019)
13. Natalie Fahy (2020–)
