= Cornish Guardian =

Newspaper published in Cornwall, England

- Type: Weekly newspaper
- Owner(s): Cornwall & Devon Media
- Founded: 1901
- Circulation: 2,052 (as of 2023)
- Website: cornwalllive.com

The Cornish Guardian (founded 1901) is a weekly newspaper in Cornwall, England, UK, which is part of the Cornwall & Devon Media group. Its head office is in Truro and it is published in seven separate editions:

- Bodmin edition
- Lostwithiel and Fowey edition
- Newquay edition
- North Cornwall edition
- South East Cornwall edition
- St Austell edition
- Wadebridge edition

In 2012, Local World acquired Cornwall & Devon Media owner Northcliffe Media from Daily Mail and General Trust. In October 2015, Trinity Mirror (Now Reach plc) reached agreement with Local World's other shareholders to buy the company.

== See also ==
- List of newspapers in the United Kingdom
