= The Cornishman (newspaper) =

Weekly newspaper in Cornwall, England

- Type: Weekly newspaper
- Format: Tabloid
- Owner: Reach plc
- Editor: Jacqui Walls
- Founded: 1878; 148 years ago
- Headquarters: Penzance, Cornwall
- Circulation: 2,407 (as of 2023)
- Website: cornwalllive.com

The Cornishman is a weekly newspaper based in Penzance, Cornwall, England, United Kingdom which was first published on 18 July 1878. Circulation for the first two editions was 4,000. An edition is currently printed every Thursday. In early February 1880 the newspaper reported that it sold 11,000 copies over three editions, published on Monday, Thursday and Saturday. The first Monday edition appeared on 2 February 1880.

It formerly had a separate edition to cover the Isles of Scilly. However, it now just has one edition which covers the whole of the Penwith peninsula as well as the Isles of Scilly. It is part of the Cornwall & Devon Media. In 2012, Local World acquired Cornwall & Devon Media owner Northcliffe Media from Daily Mail and General Trust. In October 2015, Trinity Mirror (now Reach plc) reached agreement with Local World's other shareholders to buy the company.

Historical copies of The Cornishman, dating back to 1878, are available to search and view in digitised form at The British Newspaper Archive.
