= Bath Times =

English newspaper

- Type: Weekly
- Format: Tabloid
- Owner: Northcliffe Media
- Ceased publication: 2007
- Language: English
- Headquarters: Bath, Somerset
- Circulation: 28,343
- Price: Free

Bath Times was a weekly free newspaper, published in Somerset, England, with three editions covering Bath, Midsomer Norton, Radstock, and Frome. It was owned by Northcliffe Media, part of the Daily Mail and General Trust newsgroup.

As of 2006 the Bath Times is no longer in existence.
