= Gloucestershire Live =

Weekly newspaper in England

Gloucestershire Live/Echo
- Type: Weekly newspaper
- Owner: Reach plc
- Publisher: Gloucestershire Media
- Headquarters: Gloucester, England
- Circulation: 2,927 (as of 2023)
- Website: GloucestershireLive

Gloucestershire Echo is a local weekly newspaper, formerly with offices in Cheltenham, Tewkesbury and Gloucester, England. Published every Thursday, it covers the areas of Bishops Cleeve, Cheltenham, Moreton-in-Marsh, Northleach, Stow-on-the-Wold and Tewkesbury. The newspaper is headquartered at Gloucester Quays.

Its digital counterpart is called 'Gloucestershire Live'.

== History ==
The Gloucestershire Echo was founded in 1873.

In 2012, Local World acquired owner Northcliffe Media from Daily Mail and General Trust. The newspaper is now owned by Reach plc, publisher of the Daily Express and Daily Mirror national newspapers.

Until it went weekly with its 12 October 2017 issue, the Gloucestershire Echo was a six-day-a-week daily newspaper produced by Gloucestershire Media, part of Reach plc.

Editor Rachael Sugden was appointed in October 2017 as the paper went weekly. She supplanted Matt Holmes, who had been in position since January 2015.

== See also ==
- The Citizen, a sister paper for the Gloucester area.

== References and sources ==
Sources

- Ian Jackson, "The provincial press and the community", Manchester University Press, 1971, ISBN 0-7190-0460-8, p. 31
