= Western Gazette =

Regional newspaper published in England

- Type: Weekly newspaper
- Format: Tabloid
- Owner: Trinity Mirror
- Founder: Charles Clinker
- Editor: Emma Slee
- Founded: 1863 as Western Gazette; 1743 as Western Flying Post; 1737 as Sherborne Mercury
- Language: English
- Headquarters: The Innovation Centre, Barracks Close, Copse Road, Yeovil, Somerset, BA22 8RN
- Circulation: 1,263 (as of 2025)
- Website: www.somersetlive.co.uk

The Western Gazette is a regional newspaper, published every Thursday in Yeovil, Somerset, England, owned by Reach plc. The newspaper and digital operation is based at the Yeovil Innovation Centre.

== History ==
The Western Gazette was founded in 1863 in Yeovil. The first issue was published on 21 February, with a price of one penny. In 1867, it merged with the Western Flying Post, which had been founded in Yeovil in 1743; the Western Flying Post had merged in 1749 with the Sherborne Mercury, which was first published in 1737. (Note: The initial publication of the Sherborne Mercury was in February 173 6/7, which fell between New Year's Day (1 January) and the start of the British civil year (25 March)—see discussion at Old Style and New Style dates#Start of year adjustment. The Western Gazette began noting the founding year of the Sherborne Mercury as 1737 rather than 1736 at some point during 1986–1987.)

The newspapers popularity resulted in them securing new premises in Sherborne Road, in 1870. Due to further readership increases and advancements in printing press technology, the company moved again to new premises in Newton Road, which opened in 1906. A 500 ton concrete base was used in the new premises, due to the weight and movement of the printing press. The company obtained two more printing presses in 1925 and 1939.

The business was sold to Bristol United Press in 1965. Due to computerisation, the Newton Road premises were shut in 2010. In 2012, Local World acquired owners Northcliffe Media from Daily Mail and General Trust. Reach plc (previously Trinity Mirror) took control of Local World in late 2015 as part of a £220m deal.

In June 2016, the newspaper launched Somerset Live, a digital platform dedicated to providing news coverage, feature/human interest stories, entertainment and live blogs to readers across the South West of England and surrounding areas. The website received an overhaul and a redesign in May 2017 to deliver a more user friendly experience, with improved features and interaction.
