= Clevedon Mercury =

Local newspaper

- Type: Weekly newspaper
- Format: Tabloid
- Owner: Northcliffe Newspapers Group
- Language: English
- Headquarters: Elton House, Albert Road, Clevedon, Somerset
- Website: Clevedon Mercury

The Clevedon Mercury was a broadsheet paid for newspaper delivered to homes in the North Somerset area of southwestern England. It was founded in 1863 by 17-year-old George James Caple to communicate national news and local happenings. The first issue was published on January 24. It became a tabloid newspaper in the mid-1980's and a free publication sometime in the 1990s. The final issue was published in April 2012.

== History ==
The first newspaper published in Clevedon was the Clevedon Courier, published on 5 May 1860 by Charles J. Dare from his home. The Clevedon Mercury was established in 1863 by Caple who then bought the rival Courier in 1864. Caple continued to publish the Clevedon Mercury for the next 21 years. He sold the paper to its next owners in 1885.
