= Mid Somerset Series =

Newspapers published in Somerset, England

- Type: Weekly
- Format: Tabloid
- Owner: Local World
- Founded: 1851
- Language: English
- Circulation: 6,584 [ABC 2019]
- Website: http://www.centralsomersetgazette.co.uk

The Mid Somerset Series consists of four paid-for newspapers, published in Somerset, England. They include the Wells Journal, Shepton Mallet Journal, Central Somerset Gazette and Cheddar Valley Gazette, which cover the area of Wells, Glastonbury, Street, Shepton Mallet, Cheddar, and the surrounding villages.

In 2012, Local World acquired owner Northcliffe Media from Daily Mail and General Trust.

In October 2015, Trinity Mirror reached agreement with Local World's other shareholders to buy the company. The sale was completed on 13 November 2015.
