= Essex Chronicle =

Weekly newspaper published in Chelmsford, England

- Type: Weekly newspaper
- Format: Tabloid
- Owner: Reach PLC
- Publisher: Reach Regionals Ltd
- Editor: Alan Woods
- Founded: 1764
- Language: English
- Circulation: 2,298 (as of 2023)
- Website: essexlive.news

The Essex Chronicle is a general news, weekly paper founded in 1764, as the Chelmsford Chronicle, and now owned by Reach Regionals Ltd.

== History ==
The paper began in 1764 and made news in 2002 when operations moved from the original press location of Chelmsford to the West Country. Chronicle editor Stuart Rawlins cited outdated press equipment as the impetus for the move.

Reach acquired previous owner Northcliffe Media from Daily Mail and General Trust in 2012.

== Archive ==
Historical copies of the Essex Chronicle, dating back to 1783, are available to search and view in digitised form at the British Newspaper Archive.

== Circulation ==
The Chronicle's circulation is 7,583.
