= Swansea Herald of Wales =

The Swansea Herald of Wales was a free local weekly newspaper distributed in the Swansea area of south Wales. It was published by South West Wales Publications a branch of the Northcliffe Media regional newspaper publishing house, itself part of the Daily Mail & General Trust.

It was founded in 1882 as the Herald of Wales and Monmouthshire Recorder, but dropped the 'Monmouthshire Recorder' from the title just four years later. In 1891 it underwent another change of title, to the Swansea & Glamorgan Herald and Herald of Wales, and kept that title until 1930 when it became simply the Herald of Wales.

It added the 'Swansea' in 1987 when it essentially became a weekly freesheet companion to the South Wales Evening Post with editions coming out each Wednesday.

The paper was closed in 2011.
