= Somerset Guardian and Standard =

English local newspapers

Somerset Guardian and Frome Standard
- Type: Weekly newspaper
- Format: Tabloid
- Owner: Local World
- Language: English
- Circulation: 447 (as of 2022)
- Website: Frome Standard and Somerset Guardian

The Somerset Guardian and Frome Standard are two weekly local newspapers, published in Somerset, England.

The Somerset Standard & Guardian Series consists of the Frome Standard, and the Somerset Guardian.

It is owned by Bath News & Media In 2012, Local World acquired Bath News & Media owner Northcliffe Media from Daily Mail and General Trust.
