= Brides in Cornwall =

Brides in Cornwall is a British quarterly glossy magazine aimed at would-be future brides. It was the first UK non-Gay press magazine to include articles on same-sex civil partnerships from the perspective of both female and male brides. The magazine is published in Truro, Cornwall, England by Cornwall & Devon Media.
