= North Devon Journal =

English weekly newspaper

- Type: Weekly newspaper
- Format: Tabloid
- Owner(s): Trinity Mirror
- Founded: 1824
- Circulation: 3,464 (as of 2022)
- Website: devonlive.com

The North Devon Journal is a weekly newspaper published in Barnstaple, North Devon.

== History ==
The newspaper was established in 1824 by Lex Scott, a local bookseller. It cost 7d. until 1836, when the price was reduced to 4d. In 1870, the paper was published daily, with a second edition to provide news of the Franco-Prussian War. That year, a competition was to establish the liberal North Devon Herald. Both papers survived until 1941 when they merged as the North Devon Journal Herald. In 1986 the paper changed from broadsheet to tabloid format, and became the North Devon Journal again.

In 2012, Local World acquired owner Northcliffe Media from Daily Mail and General Trust. Local World was subsequently acquired by Trinity Mirror.
