= Express & Echo =

Newspaper

- Type: Weekly newspaper
- Format: Tabloid
- Owner(s): Reach plc
- Editor: Scott Harrison
- Founded: 1904
- Circulation: 3,309 (as of 2023)
- Website: exeterexpressandecho.co.uk (Archived 21 February 2017 at the Wayback Machine)

The Express & Echo is a paid-for newspaper for Exeter, England and the surrounding area.

== History ==
The Express & Echo was established in 1904 as the result of a merger between the Western Echo and the Devon Evening Express, which was founded in 1864.

In 1909 it contained a column titled "Womanland" which dealt with various topics including suffrage protests. It was written by Exeter's first woman councillor (in time) Edith Splatt. The paper was published on green-tinted newsprint until 1930. It switched from broadsheet to tabloid format in 1979. It was published daily until September 2011, when it became a weekly newspaper. In 2012, Local World acquired previous owner Northcliffe Media from Daily Mail and General Trust. Local World was then acquired by Trinity Mirror.

From February 2015 the paper began publishing weekly on Thursdays.
