= Cornwall Today =

British magazine

Cornwall Today is a monthly magazine, published 1994 onwards by Cornwall & Devon Media, from their offices at Phoenix Wharf, Truro, Cornwall, United Kingdom. It is aspirational in style, and includes features on Cornish celebrities, and social events. It also includes scenic photography of Cornwall.

Cornwall Today won "Magazine of the Year" at the Press Gazette Regional Press Awards 2009. It was also shortlisted for "Best Designed Magazine of the Year – Consumer, below 40,000 circulation" at the Magazine Design and Journalism Awards 2008.
