= Western Morning News =

English regional newspaper

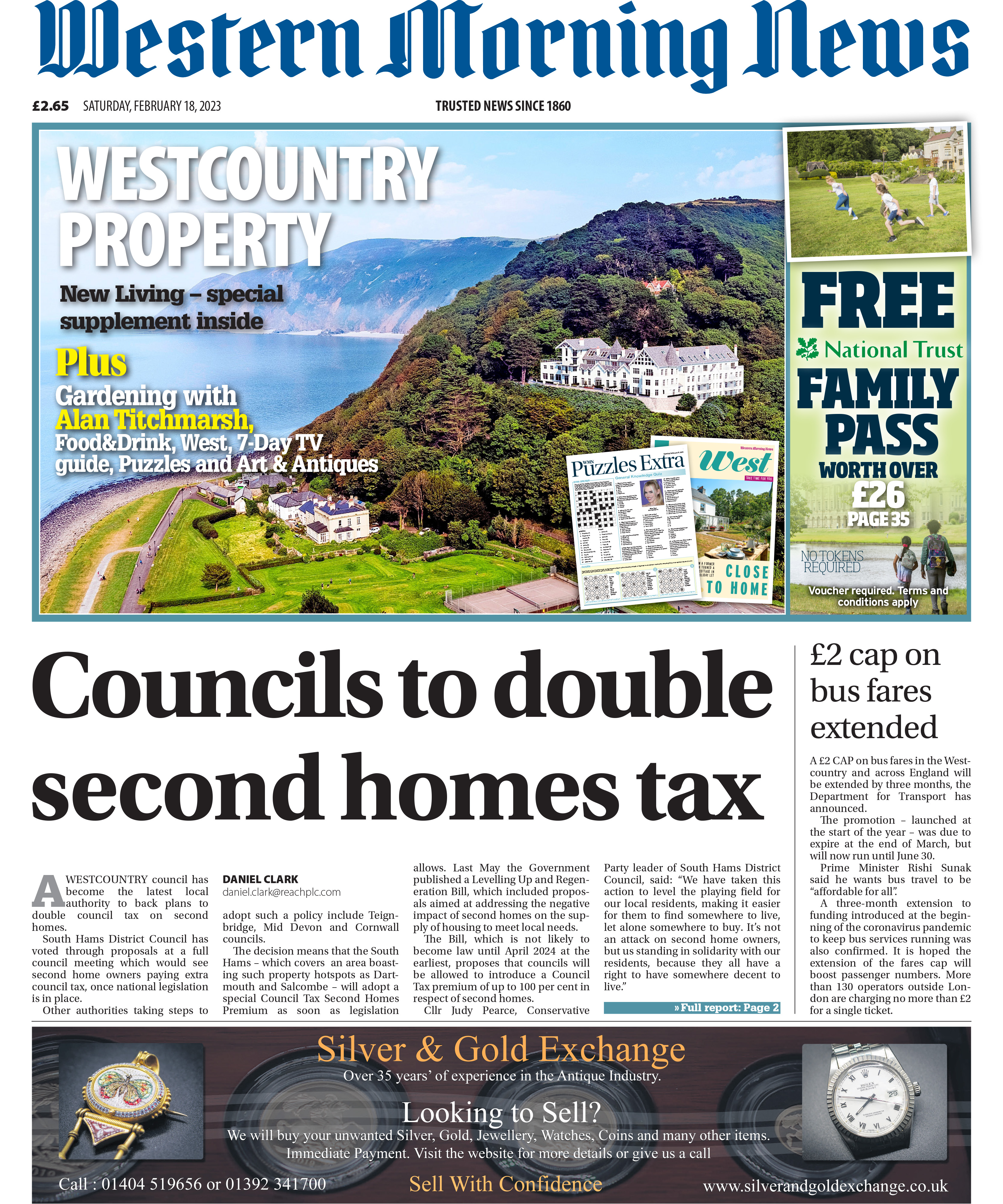
- Western Morning News front page, 18 February 2023
- Type: Daily newspaper
- Format: Broadsheet (1860–1997); Compact (1997–present)
- Owner: Reach Plc
- Editor: Charlie Elder
- Founded: 3 January 1860
- Political alignment: Independent; historically Liberal
- Headquarters: Millbay Road, Plymouth
- Circulation: 7,326 (as of 2022)
- Sister newspapers: The Herald

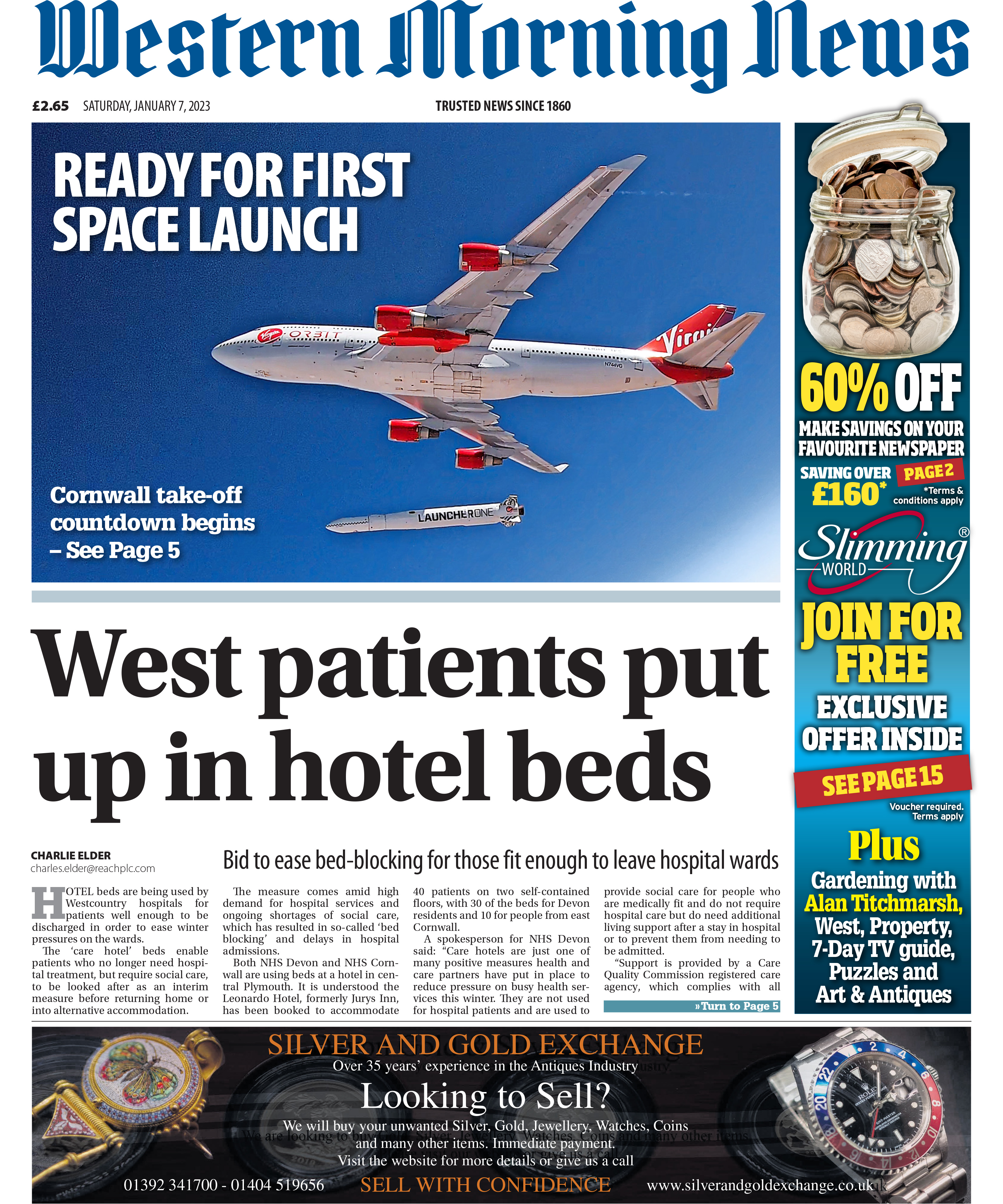
Western Morning News front page, 7 January 2023

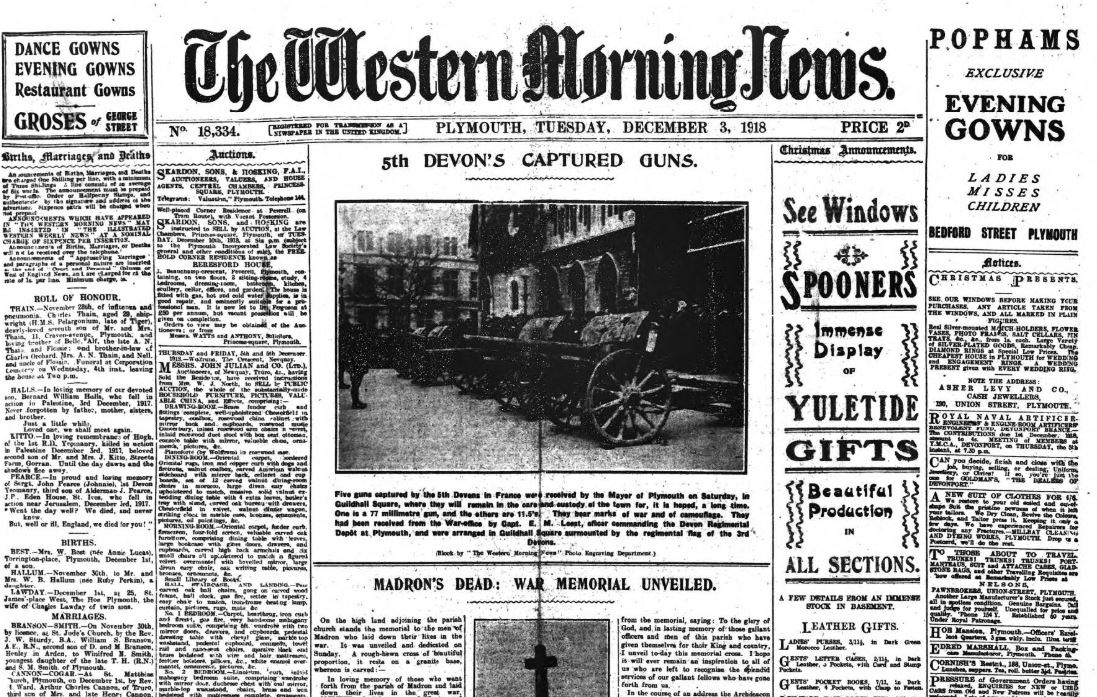
Western Morning News front page, 3 December 1918

The Western Morning News is a daily regional newspaper founded in 1860, and covering the West Country including Devon, Cornwall, the Isles of Scilly and parts of Somerset and Dorset in the South West of England.

== Organisation ==
The Western Morning News is published by Reach Plc. Its main office is based in Plymouth. Charlie Elder is Editor.

== History ==
The Western Morning News was founded on 3 January 1860, by William Saunders and Edward Spender, father of Sir Wilfrid Spender. It has been published continuously since the first edition, including throughout the 1926 General Strike and the Plymouth Blitz. By 1920, the Devon newspaper market was getting cramped, with all papers running into financial difficulties. In the same year, Sir Leicester Harmsworth acquired the Western Morning News; from 1 February 1921, the Western Daily Mercury and Western Evening Herald were also taken over, with the papers continuing to be published from the old Mercury offices in Frankfort Street, Plymouth.

== Moving Stories ==
Shortly before World War II, new offices were constructed on the same site after the demolition of the previous premises; the modern construction allowed the offices to survive the Blitz and publishing continued there until a move in 1993 to a dedicated building in Derriford, Plymouth, designed by architect Nicholas Grimshaw. The new building included full printing presses for the WMN, its sister title The Herald (Plymouth), more local papers such as the South Devon Times, and the Westcountry edition of the Daily Mail and Mail on Sunday, meaning that those national titles had later deadlines for Devon, Cornwall, Dorset and Somerset.

In 2013, the WMN and Herald moved into offices in Millbay Road, close by the Hoe, but in September 2026, Google Maps marks the Herald offices as "permanently closed".

The new address for the WMN, The Herald and Reach's online portal for the city, Plymouth Live, is Princess Court, Princess Street.

After a trial of a compact (tabloid) on Saturdays in 1995, the WMN finally followed most local newspapers in the UK and made the change to "broadloid" six days a week from 8 February 1997.

In 2012, Local World acquired Northcliffe Media from Daily Mail and General Trust, The paper had a Sunday edition from June 2014 until January 2016. In November 2015, Trinity Mirror purchased Local World. In 2018 Trinity Mirror rebranded as Reach Plc. Reach Plc is one of Britain's biggest newspaper groups. Previous editors of the Western Morning News include Colin Davidson, Barrie Williams, Alan Qualtrough, Bill Martin and Philip Bowern.

== Readership and website ==
The Western Morning News is published six days a week and provides readers with regional, national and international news. Supplements cover a range of topics, including Farming on Wednesday and Property in the Saturday edition, which also includes Antiques, Puzzles and lifestyle magazine West. The newspaper's Reach Plc sister websites in the Westcountry are www.devonlive.com, www.cornwalllive.com and www.plymouthlive.co.uk.

== In literature ==
Sherlock Holmes: "The detection of [printing] types is one of the most elementary branches of knowledge to the special expert in crime, though I confess that once when I was very young I confused the Leeds Mercury with the Western Morning News." (The Hound of the Baskervilles, Ch. 5).

== See also ==
- Eastern Morning News, founded by William Saunders, 1864, published in Kingston upon Hull, Yorkshire
- List of newspapers in the United Kingdom
