= Bristol Observer =

Former English weekly newspaper

- Type: Weekly newspaper
- Owner(s): Local World
- Publisher: Trinity Mirror
- Founded: 1960
- Language: English
- Ceased publication: 30 November 2017
- Headquarters: Temple Way, Bristol
- Circulation: 55,000 (December 2016)

The Bristol Observer started out as the Kingswood and Keynsham Observer, a weekly paper, but at this time it was a paid for publication. In 1981 it became part of the Bristol Observer series and was distributed free.

It underwent changes in editorial format and style, including a trashy sensationalist incarnation edited by Peter J. O'Reilly for a few years in the early 2000s. It subsequently largely comprised a small selection of bland "repurposed" material from its sister Bristol Post, with Post editor Michael Norton also notionally overseeing the Observer.

In 2012, Local World acquired owner Northcliffe Media from Daily Mail and General Trust.

In 2017 the Bristol Observer was quietly closed, with no warning or announcement to readers. Its final publication was dated 30 November.
