= Carmarthen Journal =

Welsh newspaper

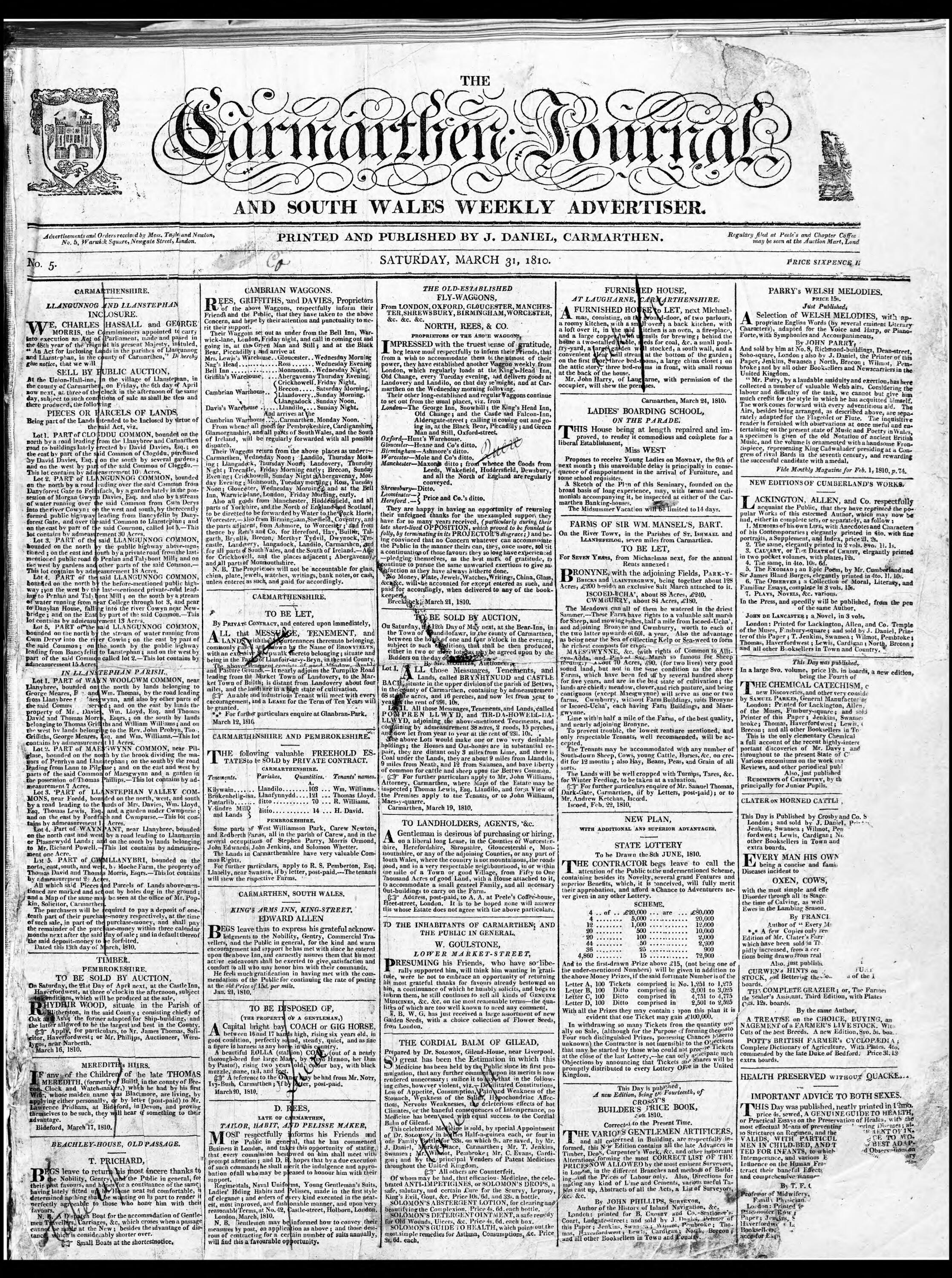
- Carmarthen Journal
- Type: weekly newspaper
- Owner(s): David Evans (1820; 18 July 1823), John Evans (July 1823; 1832), William Evans (1832; 9 July 1844), William Jones (7 June 1847)
- Publisher: David Evans, John Evans, William Evans, William Jones
- Launched: 3 March 1810
- City: Carmarthen
- Country: Wales
- Circulation: 2,451 (as of 2023)
- OCLC number: 751615680
- Website: walesonline.co.uk/all-about/carmarthenshire

The Carmarthen Journal is a newspaper founded in 1810 in Wales and now based in Carmarthen, the county town of Carmarthenshire, Wales. The building housing the Carmarthen Journal asserts that the Carmarthen Journal is the oldest newspaper in Wales.

In 2012, Local World acquired ownership of Northcliffe Media from Daily Mail and General Trust.

Welsh Newspapers Online has digitised 1340 issues of the Carmarthen Journal (1810–1919) from the newspaper holdings of the National Library of Wales. The early issues were printed by John Daniel.

== See also ==
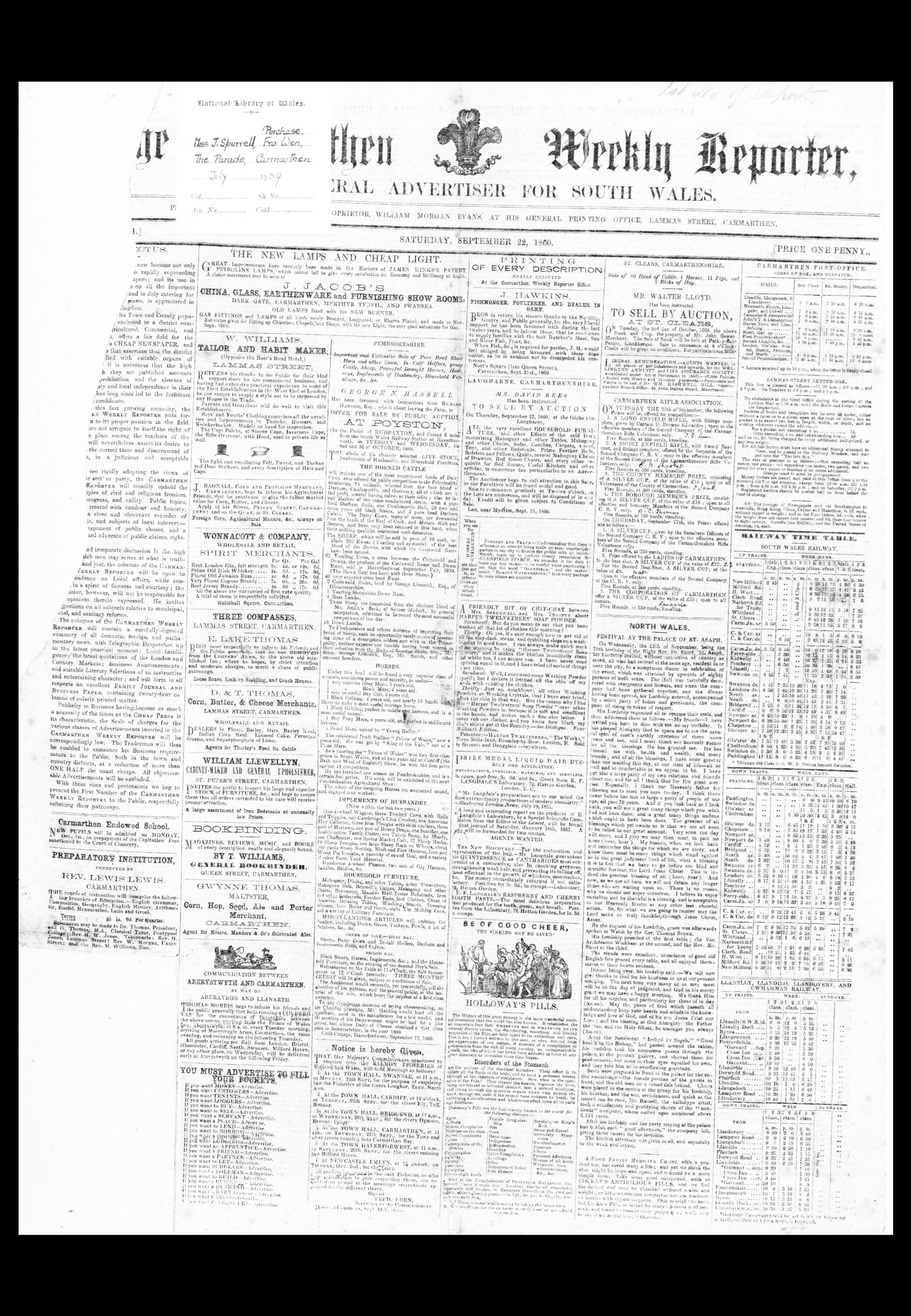
The Carmarthen Weekly Reporter
