= The Budapest Sun =

Defunct English newspaper based in Budapest, Hungary

- Type: Weekly newspaper
- Owner: Associated Newspapers of Great Britain
- Founder: Jim Michaels
- Founded: 1993; 33 years ago
- Ceased publication: 29 January 2009; 17 years ago
- Language: English
- Headquarters: Budapest
- Country: Hungary
- Circulation: 16,000 (as of 2002)
- Website: thebudapestsun.com

The Budapest Sun was a general interest, English language newspaper based in Budapest, Hungary. The paper claimed to have the largest circulation of a foreign language newspaper in the country.

== History ==
The Budapest Sun was established in 1993 by Jim Michaels. Much of the staff had come over from the already defunct Budapest Post.

It was acquired by Associated Newspapers of Great Britain, a member of the Daily Mail General Trust, in 1996.

The paper had a circulation of 16,000 copies in 2002.

The Budapest Sun was closed in early 2009, its last issue appearing on 29 January of that year.
