= Daily Mail and General Trust =

British media conglomerate

Daily Mail and General Trust P L C
- Type: Private
- Industry: Media conglomerate Newspapers; Land & Property; Websites; Events & Exhibitions
- Founded: 27 September 1922; 104 years ago
- Founder: The Viscount Northcliffe
- Headquarters: Northcliffe House, Kensington, London, United Kingdom
- Key people: The Viscount Rothermere (chairman); Tim Collier (CEO)
- Revenue: £1.1 billion (2025)
- Owner: Harmsworth family, Viscounts Rothermere through Rothermere Continuation Limited
- Number of employees: 4,034 (2021)
- Website: www.dmgt.com

Daily Mail and General Trust (DMGT) is a British multinational media conglomerate, the owner of the Daily Mail and several other titles. The 4th Viscount Rothermere is the chair and controlling shareholder of the company. The head office is located in Northcliffe House in Kensington, London. In January 2022, DMGT delisted from the London Stock Exchange following a successful offer for DMGT by Rothermere Continuation Limited (RCL).

== History ==
The group traces its origins to the launch in 1896 of the mid-market national newspaper the Daily Mail by Harold Harmsworth (later created, in July 1919, The 1st Viscount Rothermere) and his elder brother, Alfred. It was incorporated in 1922 and its shares were first listed on the London Stock Exchange in 1932.

The 1st Viscount Rothermere's son, Esmond, took operational control of the organization in 1932 and complete control in November 1940, when his father died.

Vere Harmsworth became the Chairman of Associated Newspapers in 1970. Upon the death of his father in July 1978, he succeeded as The 3rd Viscount Rothermere and became chair of parent Daily Mail and General Trust plc.

After almost 100 years in Fleet Street, the company left its original premises of New Carmelite House in Fleet Street in 1988 to move to Northcliffe House in Kensington.

Jonathan Harmsworth, 4th Viscount Rothermere became the chairman of DMGT on his father's death in September 1998. He increased his voting interest in DMGT, held through RCL, from 59.9% to 89.2% in July 2013 by buying out a stake from his relatives.

From 2011 to 2015, DMGT owned the e-commerce deal of the day company Wowcher (founded 2009), subsequently sold for £29m. In 2012, DMGT used its 55% controlling share to merge the Digital Property Group – consisting of the lettings websites FindaProperty (purchased 2004), PrimeLocation (purchased 2006) and SmartNewHomes – with Zoopla, and as of 2014 had a 52% stake in Zoopla Property Group, valued at £478m; it sold its then 29.8% stake for around £640m to Silver Lake Partners in 2018.

In 2019, DMGT joined the Belt and Road News Network.

In December 2021, Rothermere was able to purchase the remaining shares in DMGT for £885m and take the company private.

In 2023, DMGT invested in Hexagon Cup, a Madrid-based padel competition. In August 2023, DMGT confirmed its interest in acquiring the Telegraph Media Group. The TMG hosts a rival to the Daily Mail, the Daily Telegraph.

== Divisions ==
=== Consumer Media ===
DMG media is the media subsidiary of DMGT and publishes the following titles:

- Daily Mail – DMG media's primary national newspaper, with specific editions for Scotland (Scottish Daily Mail) and Ireland (Irish Daily Mail).
- The Mail on Sunday – The sister paper of the Daily Mail, published weekly on Sundays. First published in 1982.
- Ireland on Sunday – Associated Newspapers took over the publishing of Ireland on Sunday in 2001. The title was re-launched in April 2002 to coincide with the move to its new offices in Ballsbridge, Dublin. It included TV Week and in September 2006 it was merged with the Mail on Sunday and became the Irish Mail on Sunday.
- i now The i Paper – National newspaper originally launched as a sister paper to The Independent. Bought in November 2019 for £49.6 million.
- Metro – Metro is a national newspaper. Launched in March 1999 as a free, stapled newspaper, it was distributed initially in London. But since has been published every weekday morning, around Yorkshire, the North West, Newcastle and the North East, the East Midlands, Bristol, Birmingham, Liverpool, Cardiff and Scotland.
- Metro.co.uk – newspaper website. Originally created in 2002 as the digital counterpart to the print Metro, it now operates as an independent publication within the DMG group.
- MailOnline – newspaper website.
- New Scientist – a weekly magazine focusing on science and technology. Bought in 2021 for £70 million.

London's Evening Standard was owned by DMGT until it was sold to Alexander Lebedev in January 2009. DMGT still maintains a 5% share.

=== Property information ===
In the UK, Landmark Information Group includes Landmark and SearchFlow and provide information for property transactions. Trepp is a data provider for the US Commercial Real Estate Market.

=== Corporate services ===
DMGT ventures is the venture capital arm of DMGT. Investments include used-car platform Cazoo, property investment platform Bricklane, and will-writing platform Farewill.

== Head office ==
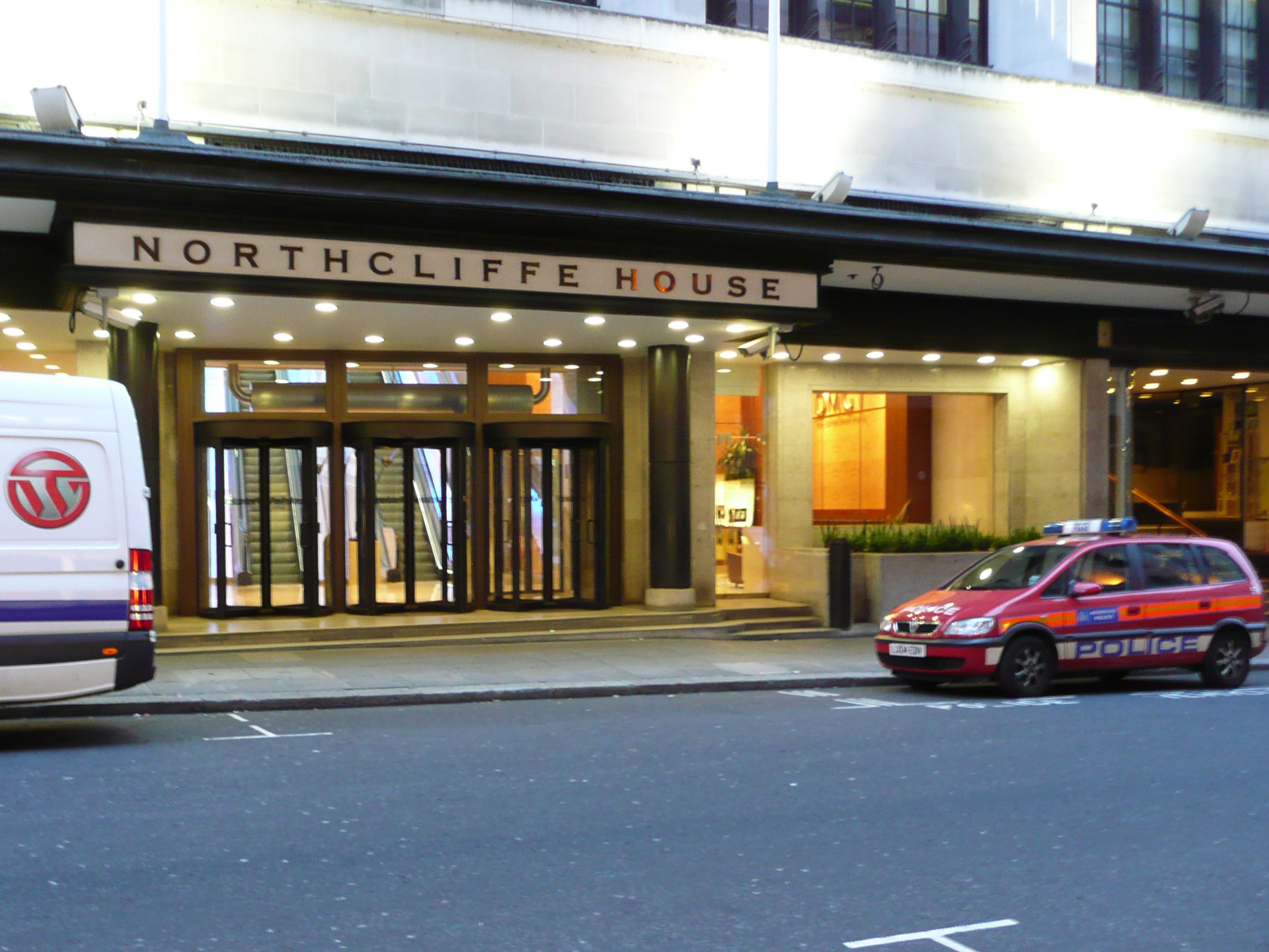
Northcliffe House, DMGT headquarters

The head office is located in Northcliffe House in Kensington, London Borough of Kensington and Chelsea. In addition to housing the DMGT head office, the building also houses the offices of The Independent, The i Paper, Daily Mail, Mail on Sunday, Evening Standard, Metro and Metro.co.uk.

== See also ==
- Multinational corporation
- Viscount Rothermere
- Mass media
- List of companies based in London
