= Richards (surname) =

Richards is a Celtic Welsh, or Cornish surname. It is based on the English version of the parent's name ending in -S. In 1881 people with this surname were primarily located in Wales, Cornwall and adjacent South-West counties of England. By 1998 many Welsh and Cornish people had migrated to cities in England particularly those adjacent to these areas. The name is derived from the Germanic ric ("power") and hard ("brave"/"hardy").

== A ==
- Aaron Richards, vocalist for the label Monstercat
- Ahmmon Richards (born 1998), American football player
- Alan Richards (born 1958), Royal Navy Vice Admiral and Chief of Defence Intelligence
- Albert Richards (disambiguation)
- Alfred Richards (disambiguation)
- Alden Richards (born 1992), Filipino actor and host
- Alma Richards (1890–1963), American athlete
- Alun Richards (1929–2001), Welsh novelist
- Amy Richards (born 1971), American activist, writer, feminist and art historian
- Angela Richards (born 1944), British actress
- Ann Richards (actress) (1917–2006), Australian actress
- Ann Richards (singer) (1935–1982), American jazz singer
- Ann Richards (1933–2006), American politician, 45th Governor of Texas
- Anna Richards (born 1964), New Zealand rugby union international
- Anne Richards (born 1964), Scottish chief executive officer of the investment management company Fidelity International
- Anthony Charles Richards, British Army officer and equerry
- Ariana Richards, American actress
- Ariel Florencia Richards, Chilean writer and scholar of visual arts
- Asim Richards (born 2000), American football player
- J. August Richards, American actor

== B ==
- Barry Richards, "Dancing Barry" dancer at basketball games
- Barry Richards (cricketer), South African cricketer
- Beah Richards, American actress and writer
- Ben Richards (disambiguation), various people and fictional characters
- Beresford Richards, Canadian politician
- Bernard Richards, British computer scientist
- Billie Mae Richards, Canadian voice actress
- Bob Richards (disambiguation)
- Brad Richards, Canadian ice-hockey player
- Brandon Richards, former National High School Record holder in pole vault, son of Bob Richards
- Brooke Richards, American model

== C ==
- Cecil Roy Richards (1893–1973), Australian World War I flying ace
- Cecile Richards (1957–2025), American feminist and abortion-rights activist
- Charles Richards (disambiguation)
- Christopher or Chris Richards (disambiguation)
- Claire Richards, British singer
- Colin Kazim-Richards, English footballer
- Corey Richards, Australian cricketer
- Cornelia Holroyd Bradley Richards, American author
- Cory Richards, American mountaineer and author.
- Craig Richards (disambiguation)

== D ==
- Davey Richards, American wrestler
- David Richards (disambiguation)
- Dean Richards (footballer), English footballer
- Dean Richards (rugby player), English rugby union international
- DeForest Richards, American banker and politician
- Deke Richards, American songwriter and music producer
- Deleon Richards, American gospel singer
- Denis Richards, British historian
- Denise Richards, American actress
- Dick Richards (disambiguation), several people
- Dickinson W. Richards, American physiologist
- DiDi Richards (born 1999), American basketball player
- Dig Richards (1940–1983), Australian rock and roll singer
- Donna Richards, pseudonym of American comics artist Don Rico

== E ==
- Ellen Swallow Richards (1842–1911), American chemist
- Emil Richards (1932–2019), American percussionist
- Emma Richards (minister) (1927–2014), American Mennonite minister
- Emma Richards (yachtswoman), British yachtswoman
- Emma Gaggiotti Richards (1825–1912), Italian painter
- Erin Richards (born 1986), British actress
- Esther Loring Richards (1885–1956), American psychiatrist
- Eugene Richards (born 1944), American documentary photographer

== F ==
- Fannie M. Richards (1840–1922), American educator
- Frances Richards (British artist) (1903–1985), British artist
- Francis Richards (sailor) (1873–1955), British Olympic sailor
- Francis Richards (diplomat) (born 1945), former governor of Gibraltar
- Frank Richards (disambiguation)
- Frederick Richards (1833–1912), Royal Navy officer
- Frederick Richards (disambiguation)

== G ==
- Garrett Richards (born 1988), American baseball player
- Gavin Richards, British actor
- Gene Richards (baseball), American baseball player
- Gene Richards (racing driver), American race car driver
- George Richards (disambiguation)
- Glen Richards (motorcyclist), Australian superbike rider
- Gordon Richards (jockey), British jockey
- Graham Richards, English chemist
- Guy Richards (born 1983), Australian rules footballer

== H ==
- Heather Richards (born 1994), Scottish footballer
- Henry Melchior Muhlenberg Richards (1848–1935), United States Army and Navy officer
- Hilda Muhlhauser Richards, American federal labor official

== I ==
- I. A. Richards, British literary critic
- Ian Richards (disambiguation)
- Irene Richards, New Zealand painter

== J ==
- J. Havens Richards, American Jesuit educator
- J. Kirk Richards, American artist
- J. R. Richards, American singer
- Jack Richards (disambiguation)
- Janet Radcliffe Richards, British feminist philosopher
- Jann Arden Anne Richards, Canadian singer known as Jann Arden
- Jason Richards, New Zealand racing driver
- Jeff Richards (disambiguation)
- Jesse Richards, American artist
- Jim Richards (disambiguation)
- Jo-Anne Richards South African author and journalist
- John Richards (disambiguation)
- Jonelle Richards, New Zealand equestrian
- Joseph Richards (disambiguation), several people
- Julian C. Richards, British archaeologist and broadcaster
- Julian D. Richards, British archaeologist
- Justin Richards, British writer

== K ==
- Kathleen Elizabeth Richards, aka Kathy Hilton, American actress
- Kathleen Richards, British composer, pianist and musicologist
- Keith Richards, British guitarist for The Rolling Stones
- Kevin Richards (racing driver) (born 1962), American racing driver
- Kim Richards, American actress
- Kim Richards (politician) (born 1971), Queensland MLA
- Kristi Richards, Canadian skier
- Kyle Richards, American actress

== L ==
- Laura E. Richards, American writer
- Lee Greene Richards, American artist
- LeGrand Richards, American LDS (Mormon) leader
- Len Richards, Welsh footballer
- Lerrone Richards (born 1992), British boxer
- Leyton Richards (1859–1948), English Congregational minister and pacifist
- Lorenzo A. Richards, American soil physicist
- Lou Richards (actor), American actor
- Lou Richards, Australian rules footballer

== M ==
- Marc Richards, English footballer
- Mark Richards (disambiguation)
- Martin Richards (disambiguation)
- Matt Richards (disambiguation)
- Matthias Richards, American congressman from Pennsylvania
- Melville Richards (1910–1973), Welsh scholar
- Merv Richards (1930–2018), New Zealand pole vaulter
- Micah Richards, English football player
- Michael Richards, American actor
- Mike Richards (ice hockey), Canadian ice hockey player
- Mike Richards (producer), American television producer

== N ==
- Nansi Richards, Welsh harpist
- Nathaniel Richards (disambiguation)
- Nick Richards (born 1997), Jamaican-American basketball player
- Nicola Richards, British Member of Parliament elected 2019
- Nigel Richards (Scrabble player), Scrabble champion

== O ==
- O'Neil Richards (born 1976), Jamaican cricketer
- Owain Richards, British entomologist

== P ==
- Pat Richards (born 1982), Australian rugby league player
- Patricia D. Richards (born 1947), American photographer
- Paul Richards (disambiguation)
- Pearl Richards, pseudonym John Oliver Hobbes, American-British novelist
- Pete Richards (American football) (1905–1989), American football player
- Peter Richards (disambiguation)

== R ==
- Rabbit Richards, American poet
- Ralph Richards (1809–1883), New York politician
- Ray Richards, US American football player
- Raymond Richards (born 1987), Japanese American wakeboarder
- Regina Richards, American singer
- Renée Richards (born 1934), American tennis player
- Rhys Richards, New Zealand historian and ethnographer
- Richard Richards (disambiguation), several people
- Robert Richards (disambiguation), several people, including:
  - Robert L. Richards, American screenwriter
- Ron Richards (disambiguation), several people
- Rosalind Richards, Welsh television soap actress

== S ==
- Sandie Richards, Jamaican athlete
- Sandra Richards, New Zealand netball player
- Sanya Richards, American athlete
- Solomon Richards (soldier) (died 1691), Irish soldier
- Stan Richards, British actor
- Stephen Richards (disambiguation)
- Steve Richards (born 1960), British TV and radio political journalist and newspaper columnist
- Steven Richards (born 1972), New Zealand racing driver
- Stevie Richards (1971), ring name of the American wrestler Michael Manna
- Sue Richards (artist) (1958–2014), Canadian artist

== T ==
- T. J. Richards, Australian coachbuilder whose company became Chrysler Australia Limited
- Theodore Richards (disambiguation)
- Thomas Richards (disambiguation)
- Todd Richards (disambiguation)
- Tom Richards (disambiguation)
- Tony Richards (disambiguation)
- Travis Richards, American ice-hockey player
- Trevor Richards (disambiguation)
- Trudy Richards (died 2008), American jazz singer

== V ==
- Vargrave Richards, Virgin Islands politician
- Vernon Richards (1915–2001), Italian-British anarchist
- Victor Richards, British actor, writer and poet
- Vincent Richards, American tennis player
- Viv Richards, Antiguan cricketer

== W ==
- Wayne Richards, Australian rugby league footballer
- Willard Richards, American LDS (Mormon) leader
- William Richards (cricketer), South African cricketer
- William Richards (disambiguation)

== Z ==
- Zalmon Richards, American educator

== Fictional characters ==
- Annie Douglas Richards, character from American TV soap opera Sunset Beach
- Barbie's fullname is Barbara Millicent Richards
- Ben Richards, main character in the movie The Running Man (1987 film).
- Brendan Richards, character from K9 and Company
- Franklin Richards, fictional character from the Fantastic Four
- Mister Fantastic, fictional character from Fantastic Four
- Sue Richards, fictional character from the Fantastic Four
- Valeria Meghan Von Doom (née Richards), fictional character from the Fantastic Four

== See also ==
- Attorney General Richards (disambiguation)
- General Richards (disambiguation)
- Judge Richards (disambiguation)
- Justice Richards (disambiguation)
- Senator Richards (disambiguation)
- Helen Nethercutt-Richards, philanthropist and businesswoman
- Jean Ramjohn-Richards, physician and First Lady of Trinidad and Tobago
- Richard (surname)
- Baron Milverton
- Nethercutt-Richards family
