= George Richards =

George Richards may refer to:

== Sportspeople ==
- George Richards (footballer, born 1880) (1880–1959), English international footballer who played for Derby County
- George Richards (Southern League footballer) (active 1911–1913), English footballer for Bristol Rovers
- George Richards (Welsh footballer) (1874–1944), Shrewsbury Town F.C. and Wales international footballer
- George E. Richards (1921–1992), American tennis player
- George Richards (cricketer) (born 1807), English cricketer
- George Richards (Australian footballer) (1888–1928), Australian rules footballer

== Politics ==
- George Richards (Attorney General), Attorney General of Trinidad and Tobago, 1962–1967
- George Richards (Australian politician) (1865–1915), Australian politician
- George Richards (English politician) (died 1746), English MP
- George Maxwell Richards (1931–2017), president of Trinidad and Tobago
- George Richards (Warren County, NY) (active 1847–1855), American politician from New York

== Other ==
- George Richards (priest) (1767–1837), English Anglican priest and poet
- George Richards (Marine Corps) (1872–1948), American military
- George Richards (British Army officer) (1898–1978), British general
- George A. Richards (1889–1951), American radio station and sports team owner
- George F. Richards (1861–1950), American religious leader
- George Henry Richards (1819–1896), British sea captain
- George Jacob Richards (1891–1984), American general
- George Mather Richards (1880–1958), American illustrator and painter
- George Ronald Richards (1905–1985), British-born Australian police officer and intelligence operative

== See also ==
- Georges Richard (1863–1922), Frenchman who ran an automobile manufacturing firm
- Richards (surname)
