= Anthony Richards =

Anthony Richards may refer to:

- Tony Richards (footballer, born 1934) (1934–2010), English footballer
- Anthony Charles Richards (born 1953), British Army officer
- Anthony Richards (Shortland Street)
- Anthony D. Richards, English footballer

== See also ==
- Tony Richards (disambiguation)
