= Lee Richards =

Lee Richards or Lee-Richards may refer to:

- Lee Greene Richards, artist
- Lee Richards, guitarist for Another Animal, Godsmack, and Dropbox
- Lee-Richards annular monoplane
- Lee-Richards molecular surface

== See also ==
- Killing of Richard Lee Richards (1960–2021), American man who was fatality shot by a police officer
- Mathew Lee Richards (born 1984), English former professional footballer
- Miranda Lee Richards (born 1975), American singer-songwriter
- Richards (surname)
