= Whammy =

Whammy can refer to:

- A whammy, a serious setback, such as one caused by a spell, curse or hex.
  - Double or triple whammy, an extra powerful whammy, a term popularized by the Li'l Abner character Evil-Eye Fleegle
- The villain of the game show Press Your Luck, designed by Savage Steve Holland
  - Whammy! The All-New Press Your Luck, the 2002-03 US version
  - Whammy! Push Your Luck, the Philippine version
- Whammy!, a 1983 album by the B-52's
- A whammy bar, a colloquial term for a guitar's tremolo arm
  - DigiTech Whammy, effect pedal
- A curse put on the opposing team by Dancing Harry
- The catchphrase of Champ Kind, a character in the movie Anchorman: The Legend of Ron Burgundy
- "Whammy", a song by Sharon Needles from the album Taxidermy
