= Albert Richards =

Albert Richards may refer to:

- Albert Richards (artist) (1919–1945), British artist
- Albert Richards (athlete) (1924–2003), New Zealand Olympic runner
- Albert Richards (footballer) (1903–1973), English footballer
- Albert G. Richards (1917–2008), American photographer and scientist
- Albert Norton Richards (1821–1897), Canadian politician

== See also ==
- Richards (surname)
- Richards (disambiguation)
