= Charles Richards =

Charles Richards may refer to:

- Charles Brinckerhoff Richards (1833–1919), engineer, designer of the Colt Single action army revolver, and Yale professor
- Charles Dow Richards (1879–1956), Canadian judge and New Brunswick politician
- Charles L. Richards (1877–1953), American Representative from Nevada
- Charles Richards (pentathlete) (born 1945), American modern pentathlete
- Red Richards (1912–1998), American jazz pianist
- Charles Richards (NASA engineer) (fl. 1960s), American NASA engineer, Rogallo manned kite-glider designer
- Charles Foster Richards (1866–1944), stamp collector
- Charles S. Richards (1878–1971), justice of the Delaware Supreme Court
- Charlie Richards (1875–1911), English footballer
- Charlie Richards (Australian footballer) (1910–1990)

== See also ==
- Chuck Richards (1913–1984), American radio DJ
- Charles Richard (disambiguation)
- Richards (surname)
