= Matt Richards =

Matt or Matthew Richards may refer to:

- Matt Richards (filmmaker) (born 1967), English film and television producer, director and writer
- Matt Richards (footballer, born 1984), English football player for Ipswich, Brighton, Walsall, Shrewsbury and Cheltenham
- Matt Richards (footballer, born 1989), English football player for Notts County
- Matthew Richards (pianist) (born 1988), English pianist
- Matt Richards (swimmer) (born 2002), British swimmer
