= Showtime Lakers =

Era in Los Angeles Lakers history (1979–1991)

The Showtime Lakers were led by players Magic Johnson (left) and Kareem Abdul-Jabbar

In basketball, Showtime was an era in Los Angeles Lakers history from 1979–80 to 1990–91, during which the team became known for an up-tempo, run-and-gun style of play and a Hollywood-celebrity following at The Forum. Built around Magic Johnson, Kareem Abdul-Jabbar, and later James Worthy, the Lakers relied on fast breaks, Johnson's passing, Abdul-Jabbar's half-court scoring, and a deep supporting cast that included Michael Cooper, Byron Scott, Kurt Rambis, A.C. Green, Jamaal Wilkes, Mychal Thompson, Norm Nixon and Bob McAdoo.

The era began after Jerry Buss purchased the Lakers in 1979 and sought to combine winning basketball with the atmosphere of Los Angeles entertainment. Buss encouraged an up-tempo style, hired dancers and a live band for home games, and cultivated a celebrity courtside following that became closely associated with the team's image. Under head coaches Jack McKinney, Paul Westhead, and especially Pat Riley, the Lakers developed one of the NBA's defining dynasties of the 1980s.

During the Showtime era, the Lakers won five NBA championships, reached the NBA Finals nine times, and renewed their rivalry with the Boston Celtics, defeating them in the 1985 and 1987 NBA Finals. The era is commonly considered to have ended after the Lakers lost the 1991 NBA Finals to the Chicago Bulls and Johnson retired following his announcement that he had tested positive for HIV.

== Background ==
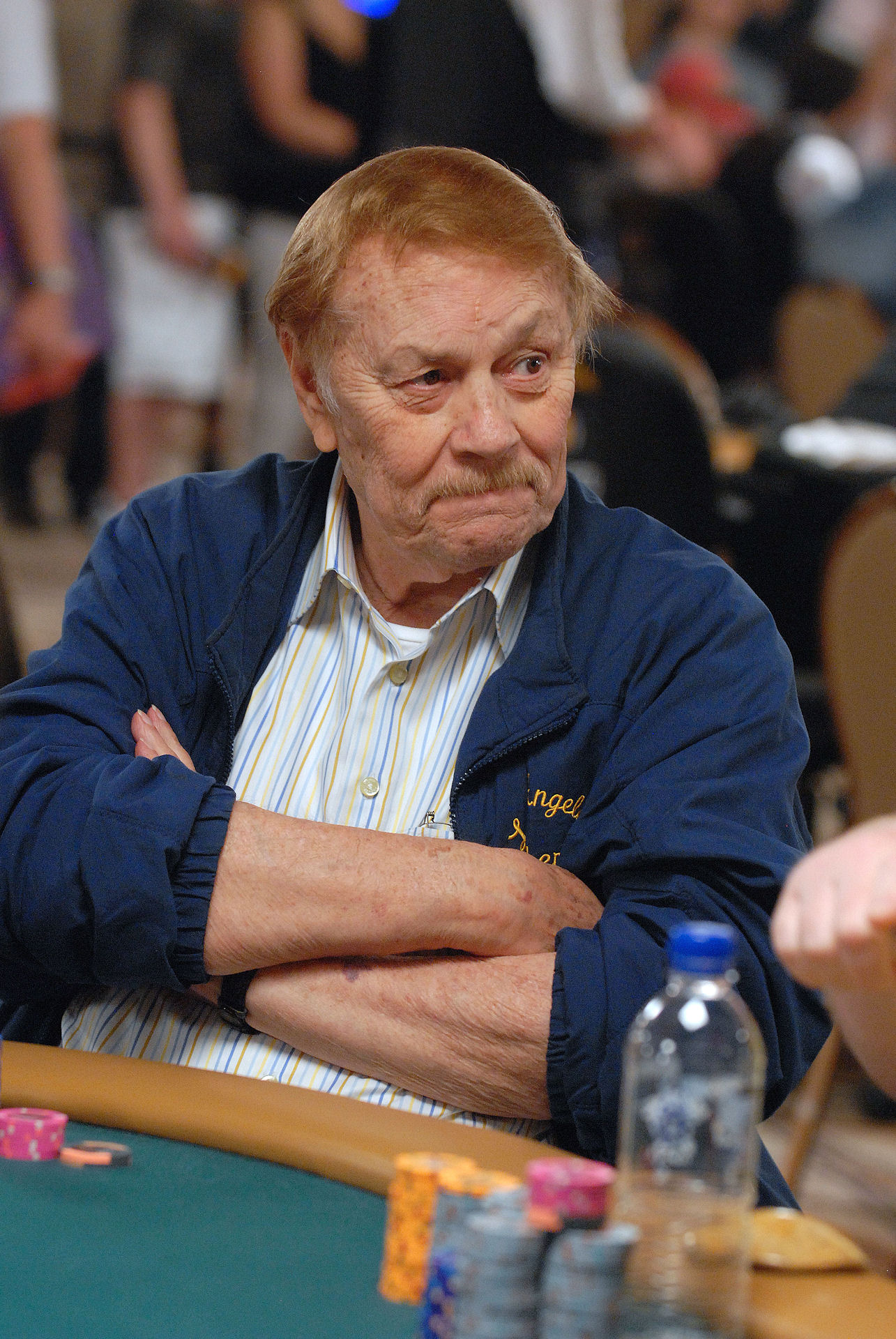
Jerry Buss's vision of Showtime was inspired by the nightclub The Horn.

In 1979, former Lakers owner Jack Kent Cooke was selling the team to Jerry Buss. Possessing the first overall pick in the upcoming 1979 NBA draft, the Lakers narrowed their choice to Magic Johnson or Sidney Moncrief. Los Angeles already had a talented point guard in Norm Nixon, making Moncrief potentially a strong complement at off guard. However, Cooke liked Johnson's smile and playing style. In one of Cooke's last acts as Lakers owner, the Lakers drafted the point guard Johnson.

Buss wanted Lakers games to be entertaining. In the 1960s, he was a regular at The Horn, a nightclub in Santa Monica, California, that attracted an upscale clientele. Buss loved the excitement of the club's famous opening act, which included a dimming of the lights followed by a dramatic singing of their signature tune, "It's Showtime". After he purchased the Lakers and The Forum from Cooke, Buss embarked on creating a grand-scale version of The Horn. He believed that a basketball game should be entertaining.

Buss sought to match the excitement of college basketball games between the USC Trojans and the UCLA Bruins during John Wooden's era. The owner insisted the Lakers have a running game. After Jerry West had retired as Lakers head coach and the team had failed to recruit coach Jerry Tarkanian of the UNLV Runnin' Rebels, Buss hired Jack McKinney to install a running offense.

In Buss' opinion, a theatrical atmosphere paired with the running game would excite the fans and strengthen the Lakers' home-court advantage. He wanted to create a Hollywood atmosphere that would be embraced by the Los Angeles culture even if it was hated by the rest of the country. Buss borrowed the term Showtime from The Horn to describe the Lakers' approach to basketball, and it was embraced by Lakers fans and the Los Angeles media.

Buss was not afraid to spend money on players. In 1981, Abdul-Jabbar was the highest-paid player in the NBA at $870,000 a season when Buss signed Johnson to a 25-year $25 million contract.

== Basketball ==
=== Offensive style ===
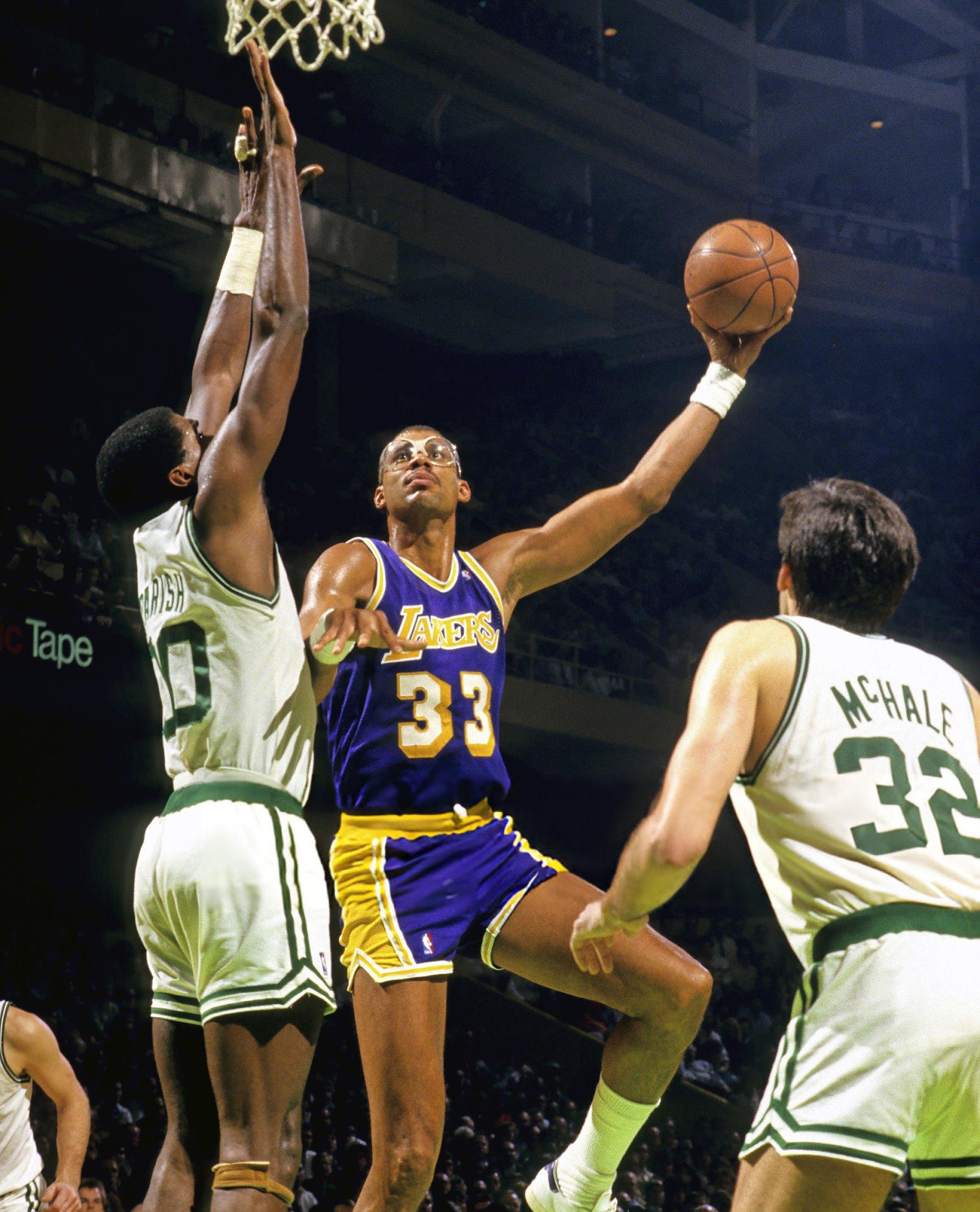
Kareem Abdul-Jabbar was the Lakers' primary half-court option

The most important component of Showtime was the Lakers' fast break. In a typical sequence, rebounders such as Kareem Abdul-Jabbar, Kurt Rambis, and A.C. Green would quickly release an outlet pass to Johnson, who would race down the court and distribute the ball to players such as Jamaal Wilkes, James Worthy, Byron Scott, and Michael Cooper for a finishing layup or slam dunk. Oftentimes, Johnson would rebound the ball and drive the ball up court himself on a fast break. He would sometimes deliver the ball to teammates with a no-look pass.

If the break was unavailable, the Lakers would settle into their half-court offense and rely on Abdul-Jabbar—the NBA's second all-time leading scorer—and his signature skyhook. Backing him up at center were Bob McAdoo, a former NBA Most Valuable Player, and in later years, Mychal Thompson, a former No. 1 overall draft pick; both were ostensibly power forwards who could change the game's pace with their quickness and outside shooting ability. As Abdul-Jabbar neared the age of 40, head coach Pat Riley had Johnson assume scoring responsibilities. Johnson's "junior, junior skyhook" won Game 4 of the 1987 NBA Finals.

=== Showtime era ===
McKinney coached the Lakers for only 13 games before he was involved in a serious bike accident during the 1979–80 season. The Lakers replaced him with assistant Paul Westhead, who led the Lakers that season to their first championship in almost a decade. Westhead used McKinney's offense, a creative and spontaneous offense that defined Showtime. For the 1980-81 season, despite missing Magic Johnson for 45 games due to a knee injury, the Lakers still managed an impressive 54–28 record during the regular season, and they were the #3 seed for the playoffs where they were eliminated by the underdog Houston Rockets in a best-of-three first round series two games to one. Westhead started altering the offense for the 1981-82 season. The team started the 1981–82 season at 7–4, but six of those wins were by four points or fewer, and the media criticized Westhead's more-structured offense. Although they had won five in a row, Buss was also disenchanted with the offense and then Johnson, frustrated with Westhead and his system, asked to be traded. Instead, Westhead was fired and replaced by Pat Riley. The Lakers' up-tempo style was restored under Riley, and they won another championship that season.

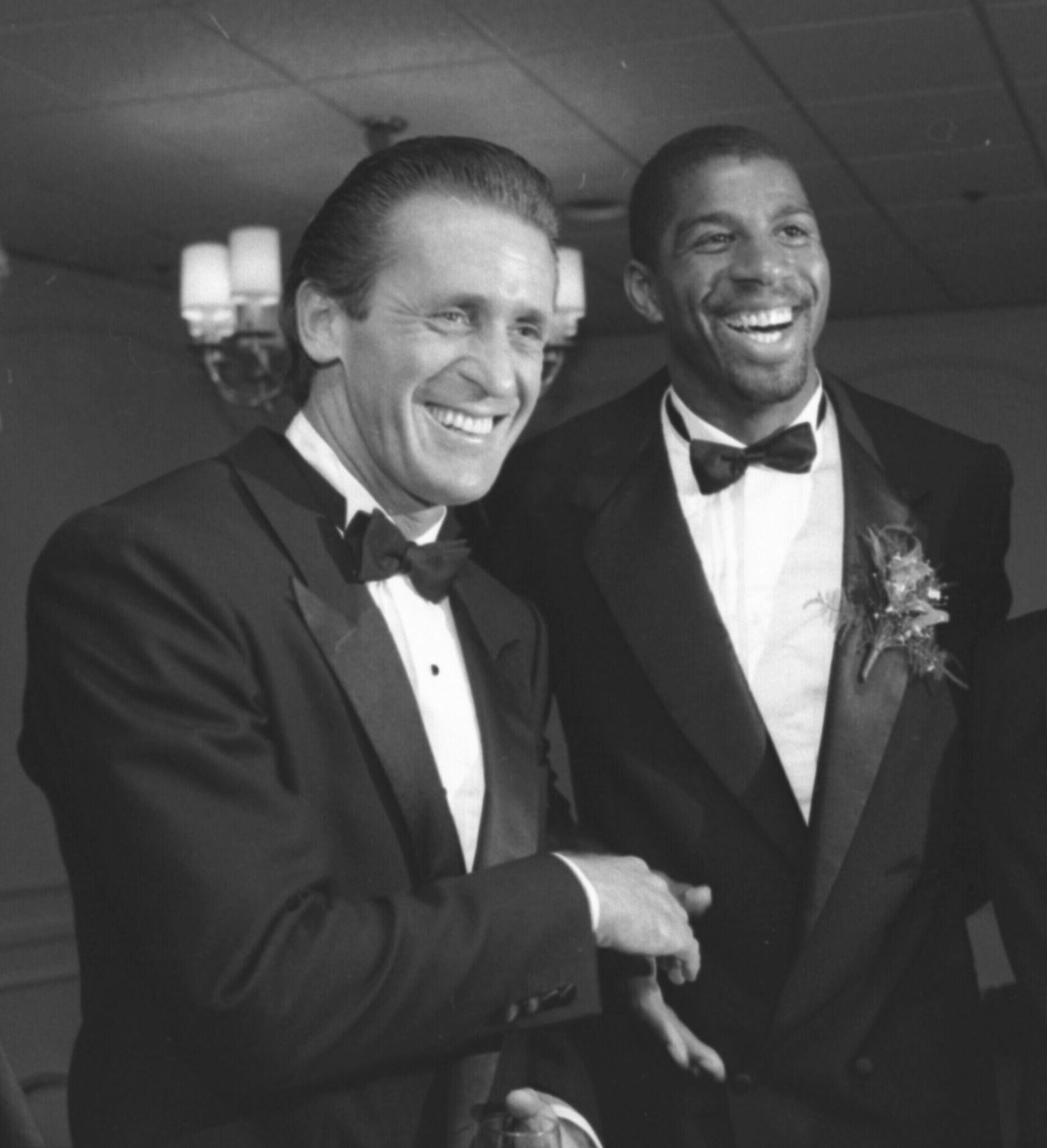
Head coach Pat Riley (left, with Magic Johnson, 1989) coached the Lakers to four NBA championships.

Riley led the Lakers to four championships. Dressed in sleek Italian suits with his hair slicked back with mousse, he added to the team's Hollywood image. Riley was also innovative on defense; he was one of the first coaches to employ a 1-3-1 half-court trap to pick up the pace of the game. Though the Showtime Lakers were known for their offense, they won championships with their defense. In Cooper, they had one of the top defensive stoppers in the game. The league-wide perception was that the Lakers played with finesse and were not physical enough to win in the playoffs. Riley emphasized rebounding as a requirement for winning championships.

The Lakers in 1985 won their first championship in nine meetings against the Boston Celtics and again defeated their rivals for the title in 1987. At the championship celebrations following the 1987 Finals, Riley guaranteed before the crowd that the Lakers would win the championship again in 1988. This was a very bold gesture as the league had not had a repeat champion for nearly 20 years. Nevertheless, this guarantee was fulfilled as the Lakers repeated as champions in 1988, becoming the first NBA team to capture back-to-back championships since the Celtics' repeat title in 1968–69 in center Bill Russell's last season. With the team older, the Lakers were more of a half-court team that season.

Although Abdul-Jabbar retired in 1989 and Riley stepped down the year after, most believe the Showtime era ended in 1991 when the Lakers lost the finals to Michael Jordan and the Chicago Bulls and Johnson retired after finding out he was HIV-positive. By Johnson's last season, (Note: Johnson returned to play in the 1995–96 season before retiring again for good.) he had grown more powerful and stronger than in his earlier years, but the league's third-oldest point guard was also slower and less nimble. Mike Dunleavy was the new head coach, the offense used more half-court sets, and the team had a renewed emphasis on defense. The Prescott Courier called those Lakers "Slow-time".

==== Season-by-season record ====
NBA champions	Lost NBA Finals

Season	Wins	Losses	Win%	Playoffs	Awards	Head coach	General manager	Owner	Ref.
1979–80	60	22	.732	Won conference semifinals (Suns) 4–1; Won conference finals (SuperSonics) 4–1; Won NBA Finals (76ers) 4–2	Kareem Abdul-Jabbar (MVP); Magic Johnson (FMVP)	Jack McKinney (10–4); Paul Westhead (50–18)	Bill Sharman	Jerry Buss	
1980–81	54	28	.659	Lost first round (Rockets) 2–1	—	Paul Westhead	Bill Sharman	Jerry Buss	
1981–82	57	25	.695	Won conference semifinals (Suns) 4–0; Won conference finals (Spurs) 4–0; Won NBA Finals (76ers) 4–2	Magic Johnson (FMVP)	Paul Westhead (7–4); Pat Riley (50–21)	Bill Sharman	Jerry Buss	
1982–83	58	24	.707	Won conference semifinals (Trail Blazers) 4–1; Won conference finals (Spurs) 4–2; Lost NBA Finals (76ers) 4–0	—	Pat Riley	Jerry West	Jerry Buss	
1983–84	54	28	.659	Won first round (Kings) 3–0; Won conference semifinals (Mavericks) 4–1; Won conference finals (Suns) 4–2; Lost NBA Finals (Celtics) 4–3	—	Pat Riley	Jerry West	Jerry Buss	
1984–85	62	20	.756	Won first round (Suns) 3–0; Won conference semifinals (Trail Blazers) 4–1; Won conference finals (Nuggets) 4–1; Won NBA Finals (Celtics) 4–2	Kareem Abdul-Jabbar (FMVP)	Pat Riley	Jerry West	Jerry Buss	
1985–86	62	20	.756	Won first round (Spurs) 3–0; Won conference semifinals (Mavericks) 4–2; Lost conference finals (Rockets) 4–1	Michael Cooper (JWKC)	Pat Riley	Jerry West	Jerry Buss	
1986–87	65	17	.793	Won first round (Nuggets) 3–0; Won conference semifinals (Warriors) 4–1; Won conference finals (SuperSonics) 4–0; Won NBA Finals (Celtics) 4–2	Magic Johnson (MVP, FMVP); Michael Cooper (DPOY)	Pat Riley	Jerry West	Jerry Buss	
1987–88	62	20	.756	Won first round (Spurs) 3–0; Won conference semifinals (Jazz) 4–3; Won conference finals (Mavericks) 4–3; Won NBA Finals (Pistons) 4–3	James Worthy (FMVP)	Pat Riley	Jerry West	Jerry Buss	
1988–89	57	25	.695	Won first round (Trail Blazers) 3–0; Won conference semifinals (SuperSonics) 4–0; Won conference finals (Suns) 4–0; Lost NBA Finals (Pistons) 4–0	Magic Johnson (MVP)	Pat Riley	Jerry West	Jerry Buss	
1989–90	63	19	.768	Won first round (Rockets) 3–1; Lost conference semifinals (Suns) 4–1	Magic Johnson (MVP, ASG MVP); Pat Riley (COY)	Pat Riley	Jerry West	Jerry Buss	
1990–91	58	24	.707	Won first round (Rockets) 3–0; Won conference semifinals (Warriors) 4–1; Won conference finals (Trail Blazers) 4–2; Lost NBA Finals (Bulls) 4–1	—	Mike Dunleavy	Jerry West	Jerry Buss	

==== Key players ====
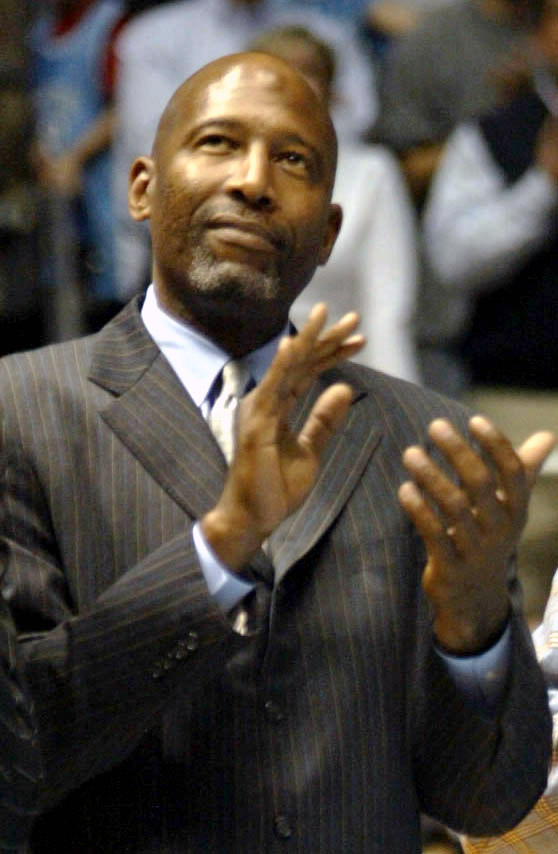
Los Angeles drafted James Worthy first overall in 1982. "Big Game James" recorded his only career triple double in the Lakers game seven victory over the Pistons in the 1988 NBA Finals.

The following is a list of the key players of the Showtime era (1979–91).

*	Inducted into the Naismith Basketball Hall of Fame

Player (Note: Statistics shown are limited to each player's tenure with the Lakers during the Showtime era (1979–91).)	Position	Tenure	Seasons	Regular season games	Playoff games	Total games	Championships won	Ref.
Kareem Abdul-Jabbar*	C	1979–1989	10	787	158	945	5 (1980, 1982, 1985, 1987, 1988)	
Michael Cooper*	SG	1979–1990	11	870	168	1038	5 (1980, 1982, 1985, 1987, 1988)	
A.C. Green	PF	1985–1991	6	489	94	583	2 (1987, 1988)	
Magic Johnson*	PG	1979–1991	12	874	186	1060	5 (1980, 1982, 1985, 1987, 1988)	
Bob McAdoo*	C	1981–1985	4	224	61	285	2 (1982, 1985)	
Norm Nixon	PG	1979–1983	4	322	47	369	2 (1980, 1982)	
Kurt Rambis	PF	1981–1988	7	493	119	612	4 (1982, 1985, 1987, 1988)	
Byron Scott	SG	1983–1991	8	627	133	760	3 (1985, 1987, 1988)	
Mychal Thompson	C	1987–1991	5	335	74	409	2 (1987, 1988)	
Jamaal Wilkes*	SF	1979–1985	6	442	62	504	3 (1980, 1982, 1985)	
James Worthy*	SF	1982–1991	9	710	138	848	3 (1985, 1987, 1988)	

== Home crowd ==
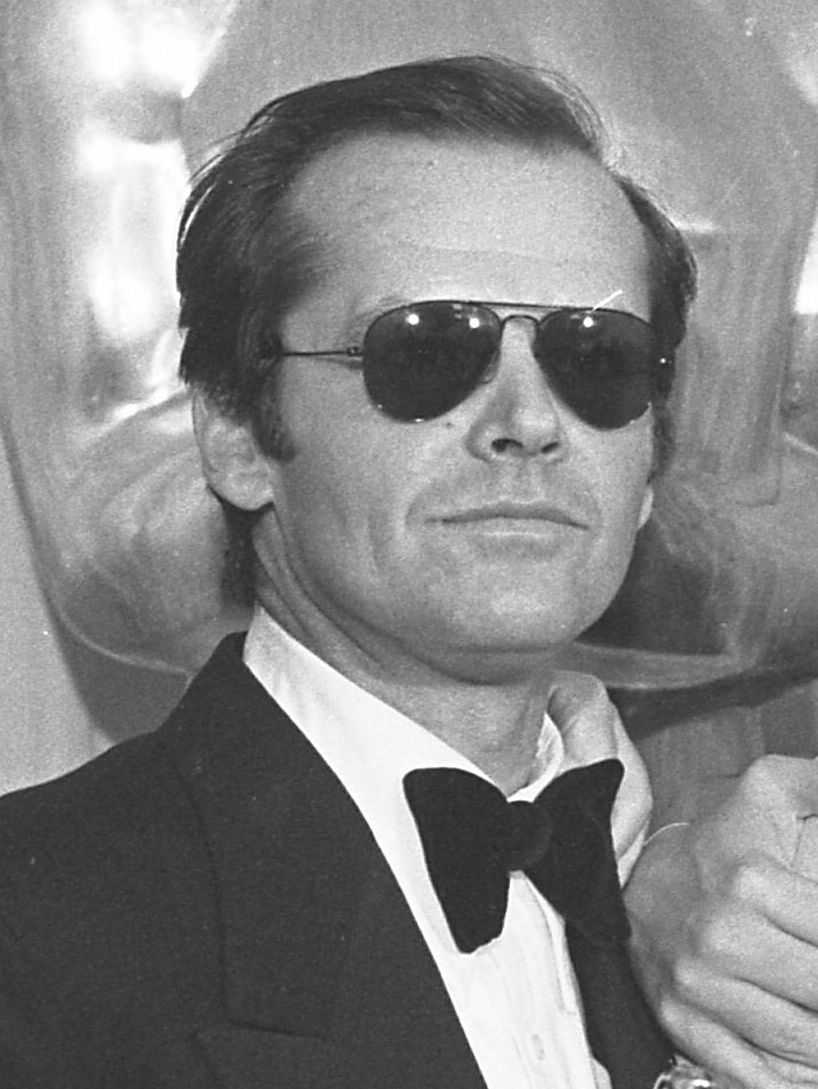
Actor Jack Nicholson was among the celebrities seen at the Forum.

The Lakers played their home games at The Forum, which billed itself as "the modern version of the greater Colosseum of ancient Rome". The Forum was a circle with an oval interior supported by 80 white concrete columns. After he became owner, Buss hired a public address announcer with a livelier voice, Lawrence Tanter. He also transformed the Forum Club, previously a family-friendly restaurant and lounge inside the Forum, into the hottest nightclub in Los Angeles.

Buss lured Hollywood celebrities and the rich and famous to the game to add more excitement in the crowd. Not only did Buss want stars on his team, he also wanted stars watching them. At the height of Showtime, some celebrities that contacted the team could not even buy tickets. ESPN wrote that The Forum grew to be "as synonymous with movie stars" as the Hollywood Sign. During national telecasts, the network would regularly show the courtside celebrities. Actor Jack Nicholson, considered the Lakers' most well-known celebrity fan, was often seen sitting courtside in his sunglasses. The Washington Post quipped that "The Forum may be the only place where the fans make more money than the players."

A fan of the college game, Buss wanted the Lakers to have live music and cheerleaders. He replaced the arena's organist with a 10-piece band of musicians from the University of Southern California. Cheerleaders were not common in the NBA at the time, but Buss ordered the formation of the Laker Girls, a talented and sexy team of female dancers. A peanut vendor named Rex would also dance to entertain the crowd. The Lakers later employed Dancing Barry, a Showtime staple who added to the party atmosphere by dancing in the aisles during timeouts wearing sunglasses and a tuxedo.

The Hartford Courant wrote, "You go to The Fabulous Forum, and you get a basketball game in between lounge acts." The News and Courier added, "Only one thing beats the thrill of victory. Victory with pizzaz." NBA commissioner David Stern said Showtime showed that "an arena can become the focal point for not just basketball, but entertainment."

== Aftermath ==
The Lakers did not win another championship until 2000, which began a streak of three consecutive titles led by stars Shaquille O'Neal and Kobe Bryant. However, the team's style under coach Phil Jackson's triangle offense was not as exciting or graceful, generally grinding down opponents behind O'Neal's strength. Rudy Tomjanovich was hired in 2004 to install an up-tempo offense and revive the high-scoring of the 1980s teams. He was not successful, and the Lakers reverted to the triangle offense as Jackson returned. Under Jackson's guidance, the Lakers were NBA champions again in 2009 and 2010.

The Phoenix Suns with point guard Steve Nash were a running team under Mike D'Antoni, and The New York Times called them "this decade’s incarnation of the Los Angeles Lakers’ Showtime". When D'Antoni joined the Lakers and Nash in 2012, he declared, "We would love to be able to play 'Showtime' basketball." With slower personnel than he had in Phoenix, D'Antoni eventually abandoned his up-tempo offense. That season, however, Magic Johnson compared the Los Angeles Clippers, the Lakers' crosstown rivals, to Showtime. "I thought I would never, ever see Showtime again. And I was the architect of Showtime. The Clippers? That's Showtime," he said.

== See also ==
- Winning Time: The Rise of the Lakers Dynasty, sports drama television series based on Showtime
