= The Queen's Birthday Party =

Concert commemorating 92nd birthday of the Queen

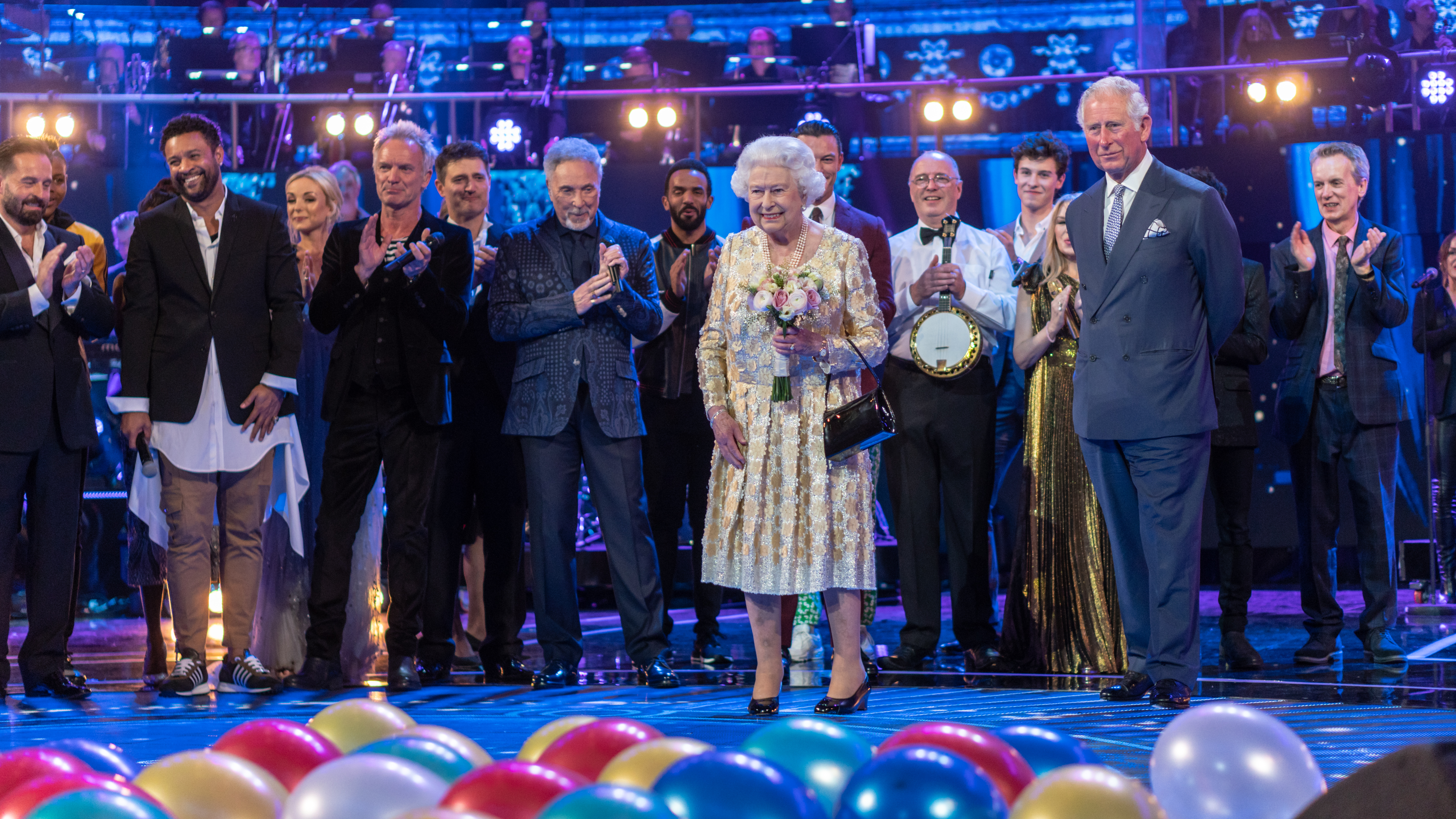
Queen Elizabeth II and Charles, Prince of Wales join the participating acts on stage during the concert's finale

The Queen's Birthday Party was a music concert held at the Royal Albert Hall in London on 21 April 2018 to celebrate the 92nd birthday of Queen Elizabeth II. It was organised by the Royal Commonwealth Society.

== Events ==
The event coincided with the end of the 2018 Commonwealth Heads of Government Meeting, which had taken place in the United Kingdom during the previous week. The concert was presented by radio and television presenter Zoe Ball and featured contemporary artists, as well as those from the worlds of classical music and jazz, all of whom are from countries that belong to the Commonwealth of Nations. Artists included Tom Jones, Kylie Minogue, Sting, Shaggy, Shawn Mendes, Anne-Marie, The George Formby Society and Ladysmith Black Mambazo. Many of those who took part in the concert were accompanied by the BBC Concert Orchestra. The Queen was among concert attendees, along with other members of the Royal family. The concert was broadcast on BBC One and BBC Radio 2 in the UK and the Nine Network in Australia.
