= Martin Richards =

Martin Richards may refer to:

- Martin Richards (computer scientist) (born 1940), British computer scientist
- Martin Richards (police officer) (born 1959), British chief constable
- Martin Richards (producer) (1932–2012), American film producer
- Martin Richards (psychologist) (born 1940), British psychologist
- Martin Richards (swimmer) (born 1955), Welsh swimmer

== See also ==
- Martin Richard (disambiguation)
