= Craig Richards =

Craig Richards may refer to:

- Craig Richards (DJ) (born 1966), English tech house DJ
- Craig Richards (rugby) (born 1978), Welsh rugby league player
- Craig Richards (footballer) (born 1959), Welsh former footballer
- Craig Richards (boxer) (born 1990), British professional boxer
- Craig W. Richards (born 1975), American lawyer and Attorney General of Alaska
- Reverend Craig Richards, fictional character on the Australian soap opera Neighbours
