= General Richards =

General Richards may refer to:

- David Richards, Baron Richards of Herstmonceux (born 1952), British Army general
- George Richards (British Army officer) (1898–1978), British Army major general
- George Richards (Marine Corps) (1872–1948), U.S. Marine Corps major general
- George Jacob Richards (1891–1984), U.S. Army major general
- John Richards (Royal Marines officer) (1927–2004), Royal Marines lieutenant general
- Michael Richards (engineer) (1673–1721), British Army brigadier general
- Nigel Richards (British Army officer) (1945–2019), British Army major general
- Thomas C. Richards (1930–2020), U.S. Air Force general

== See also ==
- Ronald G. Richard (born 1946), U.S. Marine Corps major general
- Virgil A. Richard (1937–2013), U.S. Army brigadier general
- Attorney General Richards (disambiguation)
