= Paul Richards =

Paul Richards may refer to:

== Politics ==
- Paul Richards (California politician) (born 1955/1956), American politician, mayor of Lynwood, California
- Paul Richards (Montana politician) (born 1954), American politician, member of the Montana House of Representatives
- Paul Richards (Trinidad and Tobago politician), member of the senate

== Science and medicine ==
- P. W. Richards (Paul Westmacott Richards, 1908–1995), British botanist
- Paul I. Richards (1923–1978), American physicist and applied mathematician
- Paul G. Richards (born 1943), American seismologist
- Paul Richards (anthropologist) (born 1945), British anthropologist
- Paul W. Richards (born 1964), American astronaut
- Paul Linford Richards (fl. 2000), American physicist and Frank Isakson Prize winner

== Sports ==
- Paul Richards (baseball) (1908–1986), American baseball player, manager, scout and executive
- Paul Richards (athlete) (born 1956), Antigua and Barbuda Olympic sprinter
- Paul Richards (bowls) (died 1995), Australian lawn bowler
- Paul Richards (racing driver), American racecar driver, member of the Briggs Cunningham team

== Others ==
- Paul W. Richards (judge) (1874–1956), American jurist, Justice of the Iowa Supreme Court
- Paul Richards (actor) (1924–1974), American actor in television series Breaking Point
- Paul Richards (artist) (born 1949), British artist
