= The Hotel Collection =

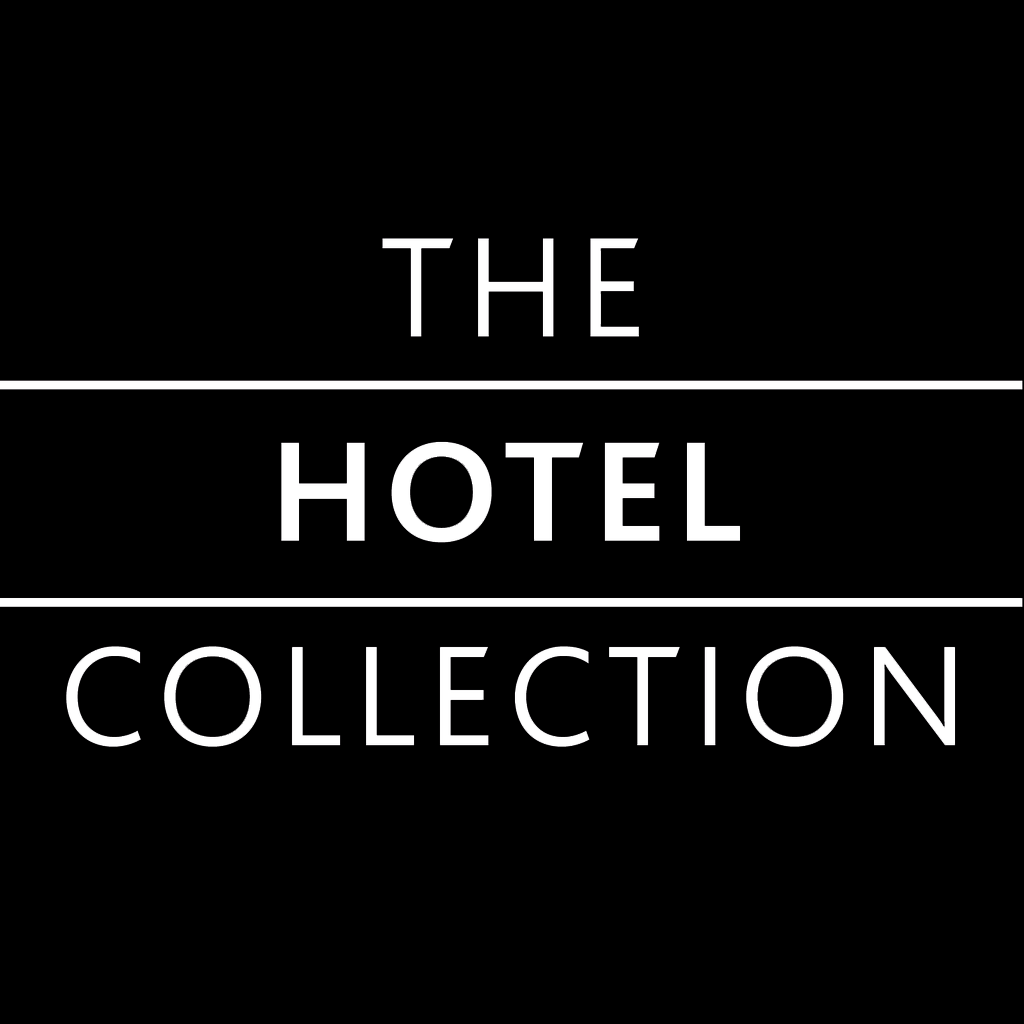
- Industry: Hospitality
- Founded: 1994
- Defunct: 2015
- Headquarters: Hinckley, United Kingdom
- Area served: United Kingdom
- Parent: Amaris Hospitality
- Website: www.thehotelcollection.co.uk

The Hotel Collection (formerly Puma Hotels Collection until 2013, Barceló Hotels until 2012 and the Paramount Group of Hotels before that) was a group of 4-star mid-market hotels operating in the United Kingdom. The group also included 18 health and leisure clubs. It ceased to exist as a separate entity, in 2015, when it was injected into the Amaris Hospitality portfolio who progressively sold off all the hotels

== History ==
The Hotel Collection started as Paramount Hotels in 1994 with four hotels: Shrigley Hall in Cheshire, the Angel Hotel in Cardiff, the Prince of Wales in Southport (since sold to Britannia Hotels) and the Palace Hotel in Buxton. It then purchased the Cheltenham Park Hotel in Cheltenham. In 1997 three further hotels were acquired from Forte Hotels: the Imperial Hotel in Blackpool, the Imperial Hotel in Torquay and the DoubleTree by Hilton Harrogate Majestic Hotel & Spa (previously known as The Majestic Hotel) in Harrogate. In 1999 the Old Ship in Brighton was purchased, and then the group acquired four hotels from the Scottish Highland Group, comprising the Carlton Hotel in Edinburgh, Redworth Hall in County Durham, the Marine in Troon and the Stirling Highland Hotel in Stirling. In 2000 the group bought the Oxford Hotel, just outside Oxford city centre. Dawnay Day Hotel Management Limited was created in 2004 to manage the portfolio of hotels on behalf of the Dawnay Day Group. The previous management which have since set up QHotels with 3 former Paramount Hotels, the Queens in Leeds, the Midland Hotel in Manchester and Chesford Grange in the South East of England.

Under the new management, in January 2005 the group grew again with the acquisition of three Hanover Hotels at Basingstoke, Daventry and Hinckley. The Head Office was since moved from Morley in Leeds to Hinckley Island Hotel. These acquisitions were followed later that year by Walton Hall & Hotel. In December, a further two hotels were purchased from Furlong; the Billesley Manor Hotel, near Stratford-upon-Avon; and the Combe Grove Manor Hotel, near Bath. Under Paramount management the Lygon Arms ceased to be a member of the Small Leading Hotels of the World and the Imperial Hotel Torquay lost its five star rating, reducing the group to a mid-market four star operator

In September 2007, the Spanish company Barceló Hotels & Resorts obtained a 45-year lease, to manage the group, from the owners Dawnay Day Shore Hotels, now Puma Hotels Ltd. Barceló, who operated in 16 other countries, took over 21 UK properties. However, as of 25 April 2012, Barceló Hotels withdrew from the UK market, paying £20.25m to break their lease agreement with the owners of the hotels.

Puma Hotels initially indicated it would revive the Paramount brand, but instead adopted its own name as the hotels brand. Then, from 10 June 2014, Puma Hotels re-branded the chain as 'The Hotel Collection' after being purchased by Lone Star Funds, a US-based private equity group, for £323m. The group continued to run the same 21 hotels.

In late 2014, the Hotel Collection announced it would dispose of 4 properties. The Palace Hotel (Buxton) (since sold to Britannia Hotels), the Marine Hotel (Troon), the Cheltenham Park Hotel and the Basingstoke Country Hotel (also since sold to Britannia Hotels). The previous CEO Fredrik Korallus was replaced with ex-Travelodge CEO, Grant Hearn as of November 2014.

On 6 July 2015 Lone Star, owners of the Collection, announced that it would bring together 89 hotels after the further acquisition of 29 Jurys Inn Hotels, 21 Mercure Hotels, 19 Thistle Hotels along with three Hilton hotels in a new umbrella company under the name of 'Amaris Hospitality'. Grant Hearn became non-executive chairman of Amaris with John Brennan operating as the company's CEO. 'The Hotel Collection' ceased to exist as an entity in 2015 and, as part of an extensive disposal programme, all of their hotels were sold off. It was announced on 13 July 2018 that Amaris Hospitality was acquired by LRC Group who injected further hotels into the portfolio. John Brennan became non-executive chairman of Amaris and Peter Stack their managing director.

== Awards ==
- In December 2014, the Hotel Collection was announced as a runner-up and awarded silver in the ‘Best UK Upscale Hotel Brand’ category at the 2014 British Travel Awards.
- The Imperial Hotel in Torquay, part of the collection, was presented with LateRooms.com's Best Kept Secret Award for Best View in autumn 2014 for its views overlooking the coast of Torbay in South West England.
