= Kris Richard (disambiguation) =

Kris Richard (born 1979) is an American football coach and former football player.

Kris Richard may also refer to:

- Kris Richard (basketball) (born 1989), US-born Romanian professional basketball player
- Kris Richard (racing driver) (born 1994), Swiss racing driver

== See also ==
- Chris Richard (disambiguation)
