= Richard (disambiguation) =

Richard is a given name; article includes lists of people named Richard.

Richard may also refer to:

== People ==
- Richard (surname)

== Places ==
- Richard, Saskatchewan, Canada
- Richard, Iowa, United States
- Richard, West Virginia, United States
- Richard I and II, underground factories at Leitmeritz concentration camp

== Other uses ==
- Hurricane Richard, 2010
- Richard (film), a 1972 lampoon of Richard Nixon

== See also ==
- Richards (disambiguation)
