= Richards =

Richards may refer to:

- Richards (surname)

In places:

- Richards, New South Wales, Australia
- Richards, Missouri, United States
- Richards, Texas, United States

In other uses:

- Richards (lunar crater), on the Moon

== See also ==
- Richard (disambiguation)
