= Chris Richard =

Chris Richard may refer to:

- Chris Richard (basketball) (born 1984), American basketball player
- Chris Richard (baseball) (born 1974), former American Major League Baseball player

== See also ==
- Chris Richards (disambiguation)
- Kris Richard (disambiguation)
