= Dick Richards (disambiguation) =

Dick Richards (born 1936) is an American film director, producer and writer.

Dick Richards may also refer to:

- Dick Richards (footballer) (1890–1934), Welsh footballer
- Richard W. Richards (1893–1985), Australian explorer
- James P. Richards (1894–1979), United States representative from South Carolina, 1933–1957
- Dick Richards (American football) (1907–1996), American football player
- Dick Richards (cricketer) (1908–1995), English cricketer
- Dick Richards (journalist), British showbusiness columnist
- Dick Richards (1924–2019), American musician with Bill Haley & His Comets and The Jodimars
- Richard N. Richards (born 1946), American astronaut

== See also ==
- Richard Richards (disambiguation)
