= Charles Richard (disambiguation) =

Charles Richard was a Canadian politician.

Charles Richard may also refer to:

- Charles A. Richard (born 1959), United States Navy admiral
- Charles-Louis Richard (1711–1794), Catholic theologian and publicist
- Charlie Richard (1941–1994), American football player and coach

== See also ==
- Charles Richards (disambiguation)
- Richard (surname)
