= Jonathan Richards =

Jonathan Richards may refer to:

- Jonathan Richards (sailor) (born 1954), British competitive sailor and Olympic medalist
- Jonathan Richards (author), American author, journalist, actor, and cartoonist
- Jonathan Richards, comic book character also known as Hyperstorm
- Jonathan Richards (Massachusetts politician), representative to the Great and General Court
- Sir Jonathan Richards, High Court judge of England and Wales

== See also ==
- John Richards (disambiguation)
- Jon Richards, American Democratic Party member of the Wisconsin State Assembly
