= Peter Gowers =

British businessman

- Born: 28 September 1972 (age 53)
- Education: Keble College, Oxford (BA)
- Occupation: Businessman
- Title: CEO of Safestore (2011–2013); CEO of Travelodge UK (2013–2020)
- Spouse: Claire Sykes (m. 1998)
- Children: 2

Peter Gowers (born 28 September 1972) is a British businessman, and the former chief executive of the hotel chain Travelodge UK.

== Early life ==
From 1991 to 1995 Gowers studied law at Keble College, Oxford, gaining a first class BA. He was President of the Oxford Union Society in the spring of 1994.

== Career ==
Gowers worked at the management consulting firm Arthur D. Little in his first job, as an analyst.

Gowers joined InterContinental Hotels Group (IHG) in 1999. He was IHG's strategy officer, then from 2005 to 2007 their chief marketing officer. He then became the boss of their Asia-Pacific region. He left IHG when the Great Recession hit and their Asia-Pacific region was split into smaller business divisions.

In July 1999 Gowers joined Bass. He became the chief executive of the self-storage firm Safestore in 2011. He spent two years at the helm of the company.

Gowers became the chief executive of Travelodge UK on 25 November 2013, succeeding Grant Hearn. He said he was "delighted to be returning to the hotel industry" and was praised by the Travelodge chairman Brian Wallace. On 28 November 2020 it was reported that Gowers would leave the office at the end of the year following a landlord dispute. He remained as an adviser to the company into 2021. He was replaced by Craig Bonnar, the chief operating officer, as acting chief executive.

In January 2022, Gowers took the position of Chairman of the Management Board and Group Chief Executive Officer for European car rental company Europcar. He stated that he was "delighted to be joining Europcar Mobility Group for the next stage of its journey and to deliver both transformational and operational improvements".

== Personal life ==
Gowers is married with a son (born September 2002) and daughter (born March 2004). He lives in Beaconsfield, Buckinghamshire. He married Claire Sykes in September 1998 in Leeds. He met his wife while studying at the University of Oxford, and she also studied law at university. He is a supporter of Tottenham Hotspur.

Business positions
Preceded by Grant Hearn	Chief Executive of Travelodge UK; 2013–2020	Succeeded by Craig Bonnar; Acting
