= John Richards =

John Richards may refer to:

== Law ==
- John Richards (Salem witch trials) (died 1694), one of the judges of the Salem witch trials
- John Richards (Attorney General) (1790–1872), Irish judge
- John E. Richards (1856–1932), California Supreme Court justice
- John K. Richards (1856–1909), Ohio Attorney General
- John Goddard Richards (1794–?), Irish barrister and justice of the peace

== Music ==
- Johnny Richards (1911–1968), jazz musician and composer
- John Richards (musician) (born 1966), British musician and academic
- John Richards (radio personality), radio disc jockey at KEXP in Seattle

== Politics ==
- John Richards (Pennsylvania politician) (1753–1822), United States congressman from Pennsylvania
- John Richards (New York politician) (1765–1850), United States congressman from New York
- John Richards (British politician) (1780–1847), Member of the House of Commons from England
- John Fletcher Richards (1818–?), Wisconsin state assemblyman
- John L. Richards, mayor of South Norwalk, Connecticut in 1886
- John Richards (Australian politician) (c. 1842–1913), writer on mining and politician in South Australia
- John Richards (Canadian politician) (1857–1917), farmer and political figure on Prince Edward Island
- John Gardiner Richards Jr. (1864–1941), governor of South Carolina
- John Richards (scholar) (born 1944), Canadian politician and scholar

== Religion ==
- John Harold Richards (1869–1952), Anglican priest
- John Richards (bishop of St David's) (1901–1990), Bishop of St David's
- John Richards (bishop of Ebbsfleet) (1933–2003), Bishop of Ebbsfleet

== Sports ==
- John R. Richards (1875–1947), American football coach at the University of Wisconsin–Madison and Ohio State University
- John Richards (racing driver) (born 1948), American former racing driver
- John Richards (footballer) (born 1950), English footballer

== Other ==
- John Richards (soldier) (1669–1709), Irish artillery officer
- John Richards (actor), English stage actor
- John Inigo Richards (1731–1810), English landscape painter
- John Morgan Richards (1841–1918), American businessman and entrepreneur
- John Francisco Richards II (1896–1918), World War I aviator
- John Richards (Royal Marines officer) (1927–2004), lieutenant-general of the Queen's household in the United Kingdom
- John Baker Richards (1776–1833), governor of the Bank of England, 1826–1828
- John F. Richards (1938–2007), American historian of South Asia
- John S. Richards (1892–1979), American librarian
- John Richards, founder and chairman of the Apostrophe Protection Society
- John Richards, Australian writer and podcaster, known for Boxcutters, Outland, and Night Terrace

== See also ==
- Jonathan Richards (disambiguation)
- Jack Richards (disambiguation)
- John Richard (born 1934), Canadian Chief Justice
