= Rosalind Richards =

Welsh actress

Rosalind Richards is a Welsh television actress of mixed race best known for playing the character of Kim on Pobol y Cwm. She appeared in Dau Dy a Ni, playing the character of Tiwtor, and in stage performances of Butterfly Kiss and A Small Family Business.

Richards grew up in the Rhymney Valley and attended the Ysgol Gyfun Cwm Rhymni. She graduated from the Royal Welsh College of Music and Drama in 2008. A singer, she competed in the Cân i Gymru song contest in 2008.

She appeared as a contender in the second series of Gladiators on Sky 1 in 2009. Richards has appeared in commercials, including for the National Assembly for Wales.
