= Shelley Rees =

Welsh actress (born 1974)

- Born: 30 January 1974 (age 52); Llwynypia, Wales, UK
- Occupation: Actress
- Spouse: Jon Owen
- Children: Lowri

Shelley Rees is a Welsh television actress best known for playing the character of Stacey Jones in the Welsh television soap Pobol y Cwm. She also plays the part of Jo Pugh in the S4C drama series 2 Dy a Ni, for which she was nominated for a Welsh BAFTA award.

Rees was a Councillor for Plaid Cymru in Pentre ward of Rhondda Cynon Taff from 2012 to 2022, but choose not to stand again following threats by a resident that frightened her family.
