= Grant Hearn =

British businessman and public servant

Grant Hearn OBE
- Education: Shannon College of Hotel Management
- Occupations: Businessman; public servant
- Known for: Former chief executive of Travelodge UK
- Spouse: Diane

Grant David Hearn OBE is a British businessman and public servant who was chief executive of Travelodge UK from 2003 to 2010 and 2012 to 2013. Travelodge credited him with turning the business into one of the UK's leading hotel brands.

Hearn was appointed Officer of the Order of the British Empire (OBE) in the 2017 New Year Honours for services to unemployed people in London.

== Personal life ==
Grant David Hearn graduated from Shannon College of Hotel Management in 1981. He lives in Surrey and is married to his Shannon College classmate Diane.

== Career ==
=== Hotels ===
Hearn held senior roles at Hilton UK and Ireland, Whitbread, and Forte Group, before becoming chief executive of Travelodge UK in 2003. At Travelodge, he owned a significant portion of the company's shares. In 2006 he was appointed as a member of the Skills and Employment Board for London, advising the mayor of London, Ken Livingstone, and the Government on the needs of London's hospitality industry. Hearn won the Outstanding Contribution to the Industry Award at the November 2007 Catey Awards.

In July 2010, he moved to the role of chairman of Travelodge UK, but was requested back as chief executive in April 2012 to address financial restructuring in relation to a company voluntary arrangement. Travelodge credited him with turning the business into one of the UK's leading hotel brands. In July 2013, Hearn announced he would step down as chief executive. He did so after Peter Gowers was named as his successor in November 2013.

Hearn was appointed chairman of The Hotel Collection in September 2014. In November of the same year, he became the hotel group's chief executive after Fredrik Korallus stood down.

On 6 July 2015, Lone Star, owners of the Collection, announced that it would bring together 89 hotels after the further acquisition of 29 Jurys Inn Hotels, 21 Mercure hotels, 19 Thistle hotels, and three Hilton hotels, in a new umbrella company under the name of Amaris Hospitality. Hearn became non-executive chairman of Amaris.

=== London Enterprise Panel ===
Hearn served as Joint Chair, Skills and Employment of the London Enterprise Panel. He was appointed Officer of the Order of the British Empire (OBE) in the 2017 New Year Honours for services to unemployed people in London. He was invested with the honour by Elizabeth II.

Business positions
Preceded by	Chief Executive of Travelodge UK; 2003–2010	Succeeded by Guy Parsons
Preceded by Guy Parsons	Chief Executive of Travelodge UK; 2012–2013	Succeeded by Peter Gowers
