= George Formby Society =

Musical society

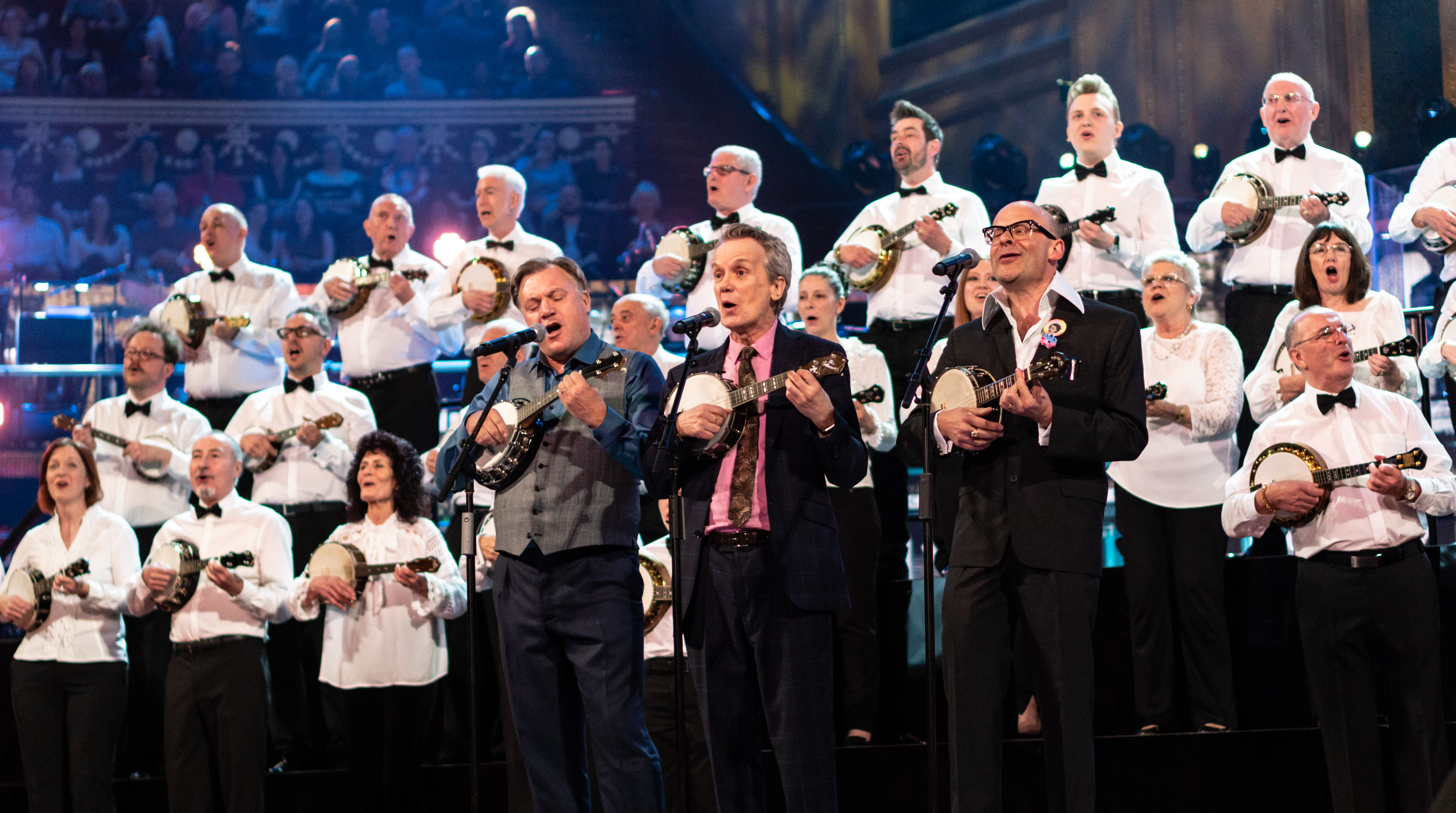
The George Formby Society performing at The Queen's Birthday Party in 2018, with vocals by Ed Balls, Frank Skinner and Harry Hill

The George Formby Society was created after the death of British vaudeville entertainer George Formby in 1961. A small group of his fans, brought together by an ad in The Stage placed by Londoner George Wilson, met together in the Imperial Hotel in Blackpool to form the George Formby Society.

The first meeting drew a lot of attention, and many celebrities of the day were there, including Arthur Askey. Three conventions are held at the Imperial Hotel, Blackpool each year, and a one-off meeting will be held at the Crowne Plaza Hotel, Nottingham, in November 2026. Members are not required to have any musical ability to join. A live backing band performs at each convention, currently led by musical director Matthew Richards

The society publishes a regular magazine, The Vellum.

In 2011 the society celebrated its 50th anniversary, and today it has more than 700 members worldwide.

George Harrison was a fan of Formby, a member of the society and an advocate of the ukulele.

The various branches perform at local events and have regular meetings. On 21 April 2018, the Society played at the Royal Albert Hall at The Queen's Birthday Party with guest artists Frank Skinner, Ed Balls and Harry Hill.
