= Chris Richards =

Chris or Christopher Richards may refer to:

- Chris Richards (Australian footballer) (1882–1971), Australian rules footballer
- Chris Richards (ice hockey) (born 1975), Canadian ice hockey player
- Chris Richards (musician), guitarist
- Christopher Richards (born 1961), Canadian actor
- Chris Richards (soccer) (born 2000), American soccer player

== See also ==
- Chris Richard (disambiguation)
