= Richard Richards =

Richard Richards may refer to:

- Sir Richard Richards (judge) (1752–1823), British judge and MP for Helston
- Richard Richards (Merioneth MP) (1787–1860), British MP for Merioneth
- Richard Meredyth Richards (1821–1873), British justice of the peace and high sheriff for the county of Merionethshire, son of the above
- Sir Richard Richards (Australian politician) (1863–1920), British-born Australian surveyor and Lord Mayor of Sydney
- Richard W. Richards (1893–1985), Australian explorer with the Ross Sea Party, 1914–1917, awarded the Albert Medal
- Richard Richards (Utah politician) (1932–2015), Republican candidate for U.S. representative from Utah, chairman of Republican National Committee
- Richard N. Richards (born 1946), American astronaut
- Killing of Richard Lee Richards (1960–2021), American man who was fatality shot by a police officer
- Rick Richards, American guitarist with The Georgia Satellites
- Richard Richards (agronomist), winner of the 2014 Rank Prize in Nutrition

== See also ==
- Dick Richards (disambiguation)
