= Martin Richard =

Martin Richard may refer to:

- A pen name of John Creasey, English crime and science fiction writer
- Martin William Richard, an 8-year-old boy who was killed in the Boston Marathon bombing on April 15, 2013

== See also ==
- Martin Richards (disambiguation)
