= Imperial Hotel, Blackpool =

Hotel in Blackpool, Lancashire, England

Imperial Hotel
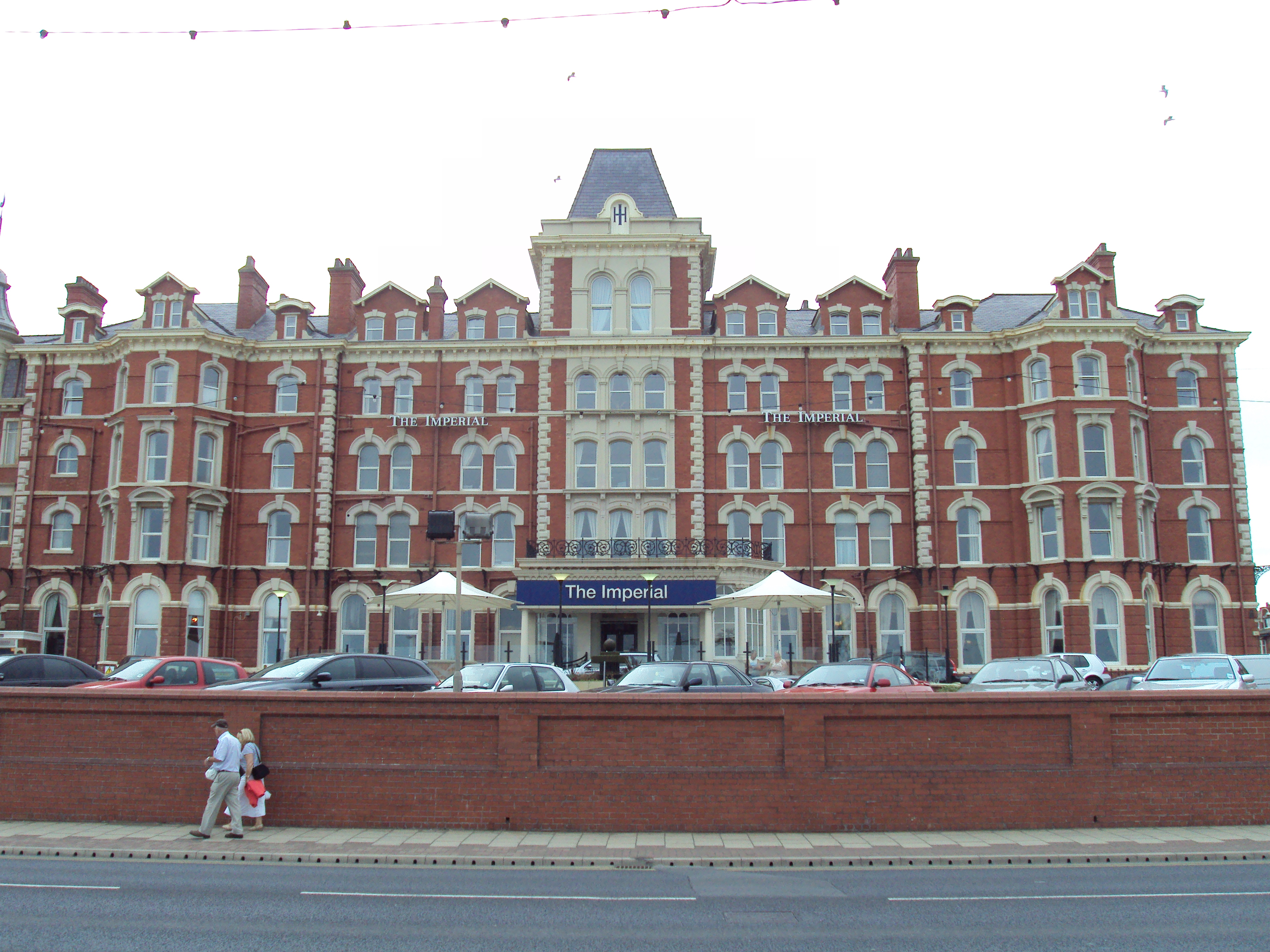
- Pictured in 2010

- Location within Blackpool Imperial Hotel (Lancashire)

General information
- Location: Blackpool, Lancashire, England
- Coordinates: 53°49′38″N 3°3′16″W
- Owner: Fragrance UK

Technical details
- Floor count: 4

Design and construction
- Designations

Listed Building – Grade II
- Designated: 20 October 1983
- Reference no.: 1072011

Other information
- Number of rooms: 180
- Number of restaurants: 1 and bar

The Imperial Hotel, formerly Puma Hotels Collection, is a 4-star hotel located on the northern promenade in Blackpool, Lancashire, England. It was established in 1867 and is situated in a large Victorian red brick building, in what, before development, was Claremont Park. The hotel has a gold and blue facade, 180 rooms, The Palm Court Restaurant and the Number 10 Bar (which has photographs and memorabilia of Prime Ministers who have stayed at the hotel). The hotel is Grade II listed.

== History ==
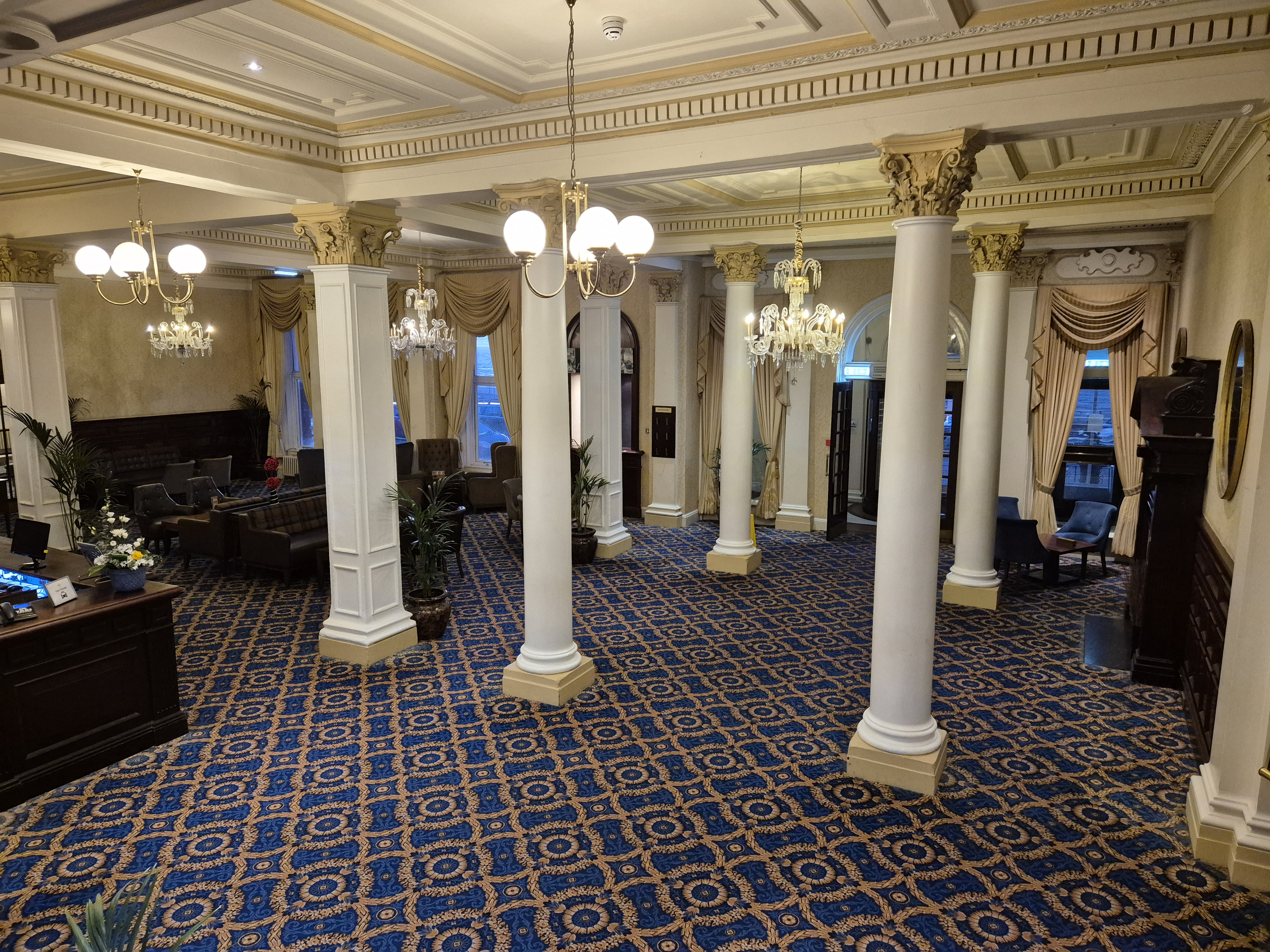
The main public lobby and reception of the hotel

The hotel was established in 1867. Charles Dickens stayed at the hotel in 1869. In 1904, the hotel was extended with the addition of a large neo-baroque style dining room. In 1912, Princess Louise, Duchess of Argyll stayed at the hotel. In the mid 20th century, Winston Churchill, Queen Elizabeth The Queen Mother, Princess Margaret, Countess of Snowdon and The Beatles stayed at the hotel. Queen Elizabeth II stayed at the hotel when visiting Blackpool, as did Charles Dickens as have many other British Prime Ministers. in 1985, Margaret Thatcher celebrated her 60th birthday in the hotel. In 2002, US President Bill Clinton and Prime Minister Tony Blair stayed at the hotel for the Labour party conference.

Owned by Barceló Hotels for many years, it was operated by The Hotel Collection from June 2014 who sold it to the Fragrance Group (Singapore) for £12.8 in 2017.

In 2023 the historic Victorian Turkish baths of the hotel were extensively restored by volunteers from Blackpool Civic Society.

== Conference venue ==
Granada Television once set up a studio in the hotel to cover party conferences held in the town. It has been used as a conference and party venue for a wide range of organisations.

The George Formby Society currently holds its conventions there four times per year.

== Concerts ==
The Imperial Hotel hosted concerts in its ballroom in the 1970s. Bands that performed at the Imperial Hotel include UFO, Judas Priest and Joy Division.

== See also ==
- Imperial Hydropathic Hotel Co v Hampson, an 1883 landmark UK company law case, concerning the interpretation of a company's articles of association.
