= Attorney General Richards =

Attorney General Richards may refer to:

- Craig W. Richards (born 1975), Attorney General of Alaska
- George Richards (Attorney General), Attorney General of Trinidad and Tobago
- John Richards (Attorney General) (1790–1872), Attorney-General for Ireland
- John K. Richards (1856–1909), Attorney General of Ohio
- William Buell Richards (1815–1889), Attorney General for the Province of Canada

== See also ==
- General Richards (disambiguation)
