= Theodore Richards =

Theodore Richards may refer to:

- Theodore William Richards (1868–1928), American chemist
- Theodore Richards (convict), convict transported to Western Australia
