= George Richards (Australian footballer) =

Australian rules footballer

Personal information
- Full name: George Albert Richards
- Born: 11 August 1888; Essendon, Victoria
- Died: 8 May 1928 (aged 39); Heidelberg, Victoria
- Original team: Wesley College

Playing career^{1}
Years	Club	Games (Goals)
1906	Melbourne	2 (0)
- ^{1} Playing statistics correct to the end of 1906.

George Albert Richards (11 August 1888 – 8 May 1928) was an Australian rules footballer who played with Melbourne in the Victorian Football League (VFL).
