= Patricia D. Richards =

American photographer (born 1947)

Patricia D. Richards (born 1947) is an American photographer.

Her work is included in the collection of the Museum of Fine Arts, Houston, the Harry Ransom Center at the University of Texas Austin, and the Amon Carter Museum of American Art. Richards work has also been included in several books and the magazine The Sun.
