= Jack Richards (cricketer, born 1918) =

English cricketer

Personal information
- Full name: John Lawson Richards
- Born: 6 October 1918; Williton, Somerset, England
- Died: 2 November 1944 (aged 26); Gelderland, German-occupied Netherlands

Domestic team information
- Years: Team
- 1939: Cambridge University

Career statistics
Competition	First-class
Matches	1
Runs scored	0
Batting average	0
100s/50s	–/–
Top score	0
Balls bowled	50
Wickets	–
Bowling average	–
5 wickets in innings	–
10 wickets in match	–
Best bowling	0/18
Catches/stumpings	0/0
- Source: Cricinfo, 6 August 2020

John Lawson Richards (6 October 1918 – 2 November 1944) was an English first-class cricketer and British Army officer.

Born in Williton in October 1918, Richards was educated at Monmouth School and Selwyn College, Cambridge, where he played several sports, including cricket. He entered Selwyn College in 1938, where he read mathematics. Between 24 and 26 May 1939, Richards made his only first-class appearance for Cambridge against Yorkshire, in which he was bowled twice for a duck and did not gain any runs.

On 8 June 1940, seven months after the outbreak of the Second World War, Richards was commissioned as a second lieutenant in the Royal Engineers, in which he was involved in bomb disposal. During leave periods in 1941 and 1942, he appeared for Cambridge in six wartime cricket matches. Richards was killed in the Netherlands on 2 November 1944 and is buried at Jonkerbos War Cemetery.
