= Stephen Richards =

Stephen, Steven, Steve or Stevie Richards may refer to:

== Arts and entertainment ==
- Mark Stevens (actor) (a.k.a. Stephen Richards, 1916–1994), American actor
- Steve Richards (born 1960), British television and radio presenter and newspaper political columnist
- Stephen Richards, American vocalist, guitarist, and founder member of the rock music group Taproot

== Sports ==
- Steve Richards (footballer) (born 1961), Scottish footballer
- Steve Richards (rugby union), English international rugby union player
- Stephen Richards (canoeist) (born 1965), New Zealand sprint canoer
- Stevie Richards (Michael Manna, born 1971), American wrestler
- Steven Richards (born 1972), Australian racing driver

== Others ==
- Stephen Richards (politician) (1820–1894), Canadian lawyer and politician
- Steve Richards, Australian founder of holographic kinetics therapy
- Stephen Richards (murderer) (1854–1879), American serial killer
- Stephen L Richards (1879–1959), American religious leader
- Sir Stephen Richards (judge) (born 1950), Welsh jurist, Lord Justice of Appeal
- Stephen Richards (business executive) (born 1965), New Zealand business executive
- Stephen Richards (author) (fl. 1990s–2000s), British investigative journalist and author, founded Mirage Publishing
- Stephen John Richards, Australian herpetologist
