= Judge Richards =

Judge Richards may refer to:

- Ian Richards (judge) (born 1975), judge of the Florida 17th Judicial Circuit
- Jon Richards (born 1963), judge of the Wisconsin circuit court
- Richard Richards (judge) (1752–1823), Welsh Lord Chief Baron of the Exchequer

== See also ==
- Justice Richards (disambiguation)
