= Victor Richards =

British actor and poet

Victor Richards is a British actor, writer and poet of West Indian descent, who also performs as VJay. He lives in Leicester, England.

Richards worked as both a fashion model and choreographer for many years before taking a High diploma in Performing Arts in the mid-1990s. He now runs his own theatre company, V Jay Theatre Productions, specializing in Theatre in Education. He has written a trilogy of one-man plays – Streets Paved with Gold, Return to the Caribbean and Children of the First Generation – and a volume of poetry, Poetry Trilogy, was his first published book, in 2008.

In addition to appearing in numerous television productions Victor Richards worked with the BBC first in 2008 as part of Black History Month and then in 2009 as they filmed him travelling from the West Indies to Britain, as his parents and many other first-generation West Indian families had in the 1950s.
