= Killing of Richard Lee Richards =

2021 killing in Tucson, Arizona, U.S.

- Location: 32.136025°N 111.003316°W; West Valencia Road, Midvale Park, Tucson, Arizona
- Date: November 29, 2021
- Attack type: Shooting
- Victim: Richard Lee Richards
- Perpetrator: Ryan Remington

Richard Lee Richards (September 13, 1960 – November 29, 2021) was a 61-year-old United States citizen who died after being shot nine times in the back by police officer Ryan Remington on November 29, 2021. The shooting occurred as Richards was entering a Lowe's store in Tucson, Arizona, while holding a knife in his hand. Remington ordered him to stop moving toward the store and to surrender the knife, and shot him after he failed to comply.

== Background ==
Richard Lee Richards was disabled and relied on a wheelchair for mobility. He had a long criminal history and had spent lengthy periods in prison. According to his younger sister, Victoria Richards, his confinement to a wheelchair resulted from a hip surgery he received during his most recent prison sentence. She also told KGUN that Richards had battled drug addiction and had spent the majority of his life in incarceration.

She also said he volunteered to help fight forest fires while serving a prison sentence. While engaged in this work, he fell off a cliff and hit his head. The incident caused him to suffer severe brain damage. He later came to live with her and she taught him how to drive, as well as how to count money. "Everything came back pretty quickly, but it was like having a child again," she told the TV news channel in 2021.

== Incident ==
On November 29, 2021, Tucson Arizona Police Department Officer Ryan Remington was off duty and working a security detail at a local store in the Midvale Park area. Richards, who was in a mobility scooter, was believed to have stolen a toolbox from a Walmart store and was reported to Remington by an employee. When asked by Remington to show a receipt for the toolbox, Richards brandished a knife. Richards reportedly stated, "Here's your receipt," and refused Remington's orders to surrender the knife, instead continuing to move through the parking lot.

Remington followed Richards as he was moving toward a Lowe's store. According to a Lowe’s employee, Richards then stated, "If you want to me to put down the knife, you're going to have to shoot me." Remington responded by saying "Do not go into the store, sir." Approximately 3 seconds later, when Richards was heading towards the entry of the store, Remington shot him nine times in his back, whereupon he fell dead from his wheelchair and was handcuffed by Remington.

== Following events, trial, and aftermath ==
On December 4, 2021 a protest was called to be held for the killing of Richards, and other police wrongdoings by a coalition of groups and individuals from Tucson who are concerned about what effect that law enforcement and their violence have on their communities.

On November 30, 2021, Remington was fired from the police department. This was because the shooting represented "a clear violation of department policy and directly contradicts multiple aspects of our use of force and training". On August 24, 2022, Remington was charged with manslaughter.

Remington pleaded not guilty after appearing in court. On September 19, 2022, Richards' estate filed a federal lawsuit against Remington and the city, claiming the use of excessive force and other issues. On December 2, 2022, Remington's lawyer argued that prosecutors had made misleading and false statements to the grand jury. The judge remanded the case back to the grand jury.

In January 2023, a second grand jury voted not to indict Remington. On January 17, 2023, a judge dismissed the manslaughter charge without prejudice, meaning that it can be re-filed. Richards' sister has attempted to sue Remington, and has spoken up in interviews. Remington has sued to get his job back as a police officer and has asked to be reinstated.

In January 2025, another grand jury declined to indict Remington. The Pima County grand jury rejected the case. The case was dropped on January 24.
