= Trevor Richards =

Trevor Richards may refer to:

- Trevor Richards (baseball) (born 1993), American baseball pitcher
- Trevor Richards (musician) (born 1945), English drummer
- Trevor Richards (campaigner) (born 1946), inaugural president of Halt All Racist Tours in New Zealand
