= Jack Richards =

Jack Richards may refer to:

- Jack Richards (cricketer, born 1958), English cricketer
- Jack Richards (cricketer, born 1918), English cricketer and British Army officer
- Jack C. Richards, applied linguist from New Zealand

== See also ==
- A Year in the Death of Jack Richards, a 2004 Canadian psychological drama film
