= Alfred Richards =

Alfred Richards may refer to:

- Alfred Bate Richards (1820–1876), journalist and author
- Alfred Joseph Richards (1879–1953), recipient of the Victoria Cross
- Alfred Newton Richards (1876–1966), pharmacologist
- Alfred Richards (sportsman) (1867–1904), South African cricketer and rugby union player
- Alfred N. Richards (ice skater); see United States Figure Skating Championships
