= Robert Richards =

Robert or Bob Richards may refer to:

== Politicians ==
- Robert Richards (Australian politician) (1885–1967), 32nd Premier of South Australia
- Robert Richards (Welsh politician) (1884–1954), British Labour Party politician, MP for Wrexham

== Sportsmen ==
- Bobby Richards (born 1938), American football player
- Bob Richards (cricketer) (born 1934), English former cricketer
- Robert Richards (Australian rower) (born 1971), Australian rower
- Bob Richards (Canadian rower) (1909–1989), Canadian rower
- Bob Richards (1926–2023), American pole vaulter and decathlete
- Bob Richards (runner), winner of the 1966 NCAA DI steeplechase title
- Bob Richards (pole vaulter, born 1950), American pole vaulter, 1971 All-American for the San Jose State Spartans track and field team

== Others ==
- Robert G. Richards, Chief Justice of Saskatchewan
- Robert Hallowell Richards (1844–1945), American mining engineer
- Robert H. Richards (politician), Delaware Attorney General from 1905–1909
- Robert J. Richards (born 1942), American historian of science
- Robert L. Richards, American screenwriter in 1940s and 1950s
- Robert D. Richards, Canadian-born space entrepreneur
- Robert Kerr Richards (1834–1924), American prominent in New York Society
- Bob Richards (musician), Welsh-born drummer (Man, Asia)
- Bob Richards (meteorologist) (1956–1994), American TV personality
- Bob, fictional character from the Tekken series of video games whose full name is Robert Richards
