= Dancing Barry =

American entertainer

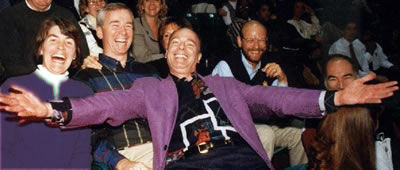
- Dancing Barry at an original Charlotte Hornets Game
- Born: Barry Richards c. 1950
- Other name: Magic Barry
- Education: University of Houston
- Occupations: Entertainer; Corporate game show producer; Magician
- Employer: Los Angeles Lakers

Barry Richards (born c. 1950) is an entertainer who performed at National Basketball Association (NBA) games under the stage name Dancing Barry. He primarily performed with the Los Angeles Lakers and was a staple of their Showtime era.

Richards made his Dancing Barry debut for the Houston Rockets in 1975, and he performed in Houston for a few years. Starting in 1983, he was a paid performer for the Lakers for seven full seasons. He later performed for the Charlotte Hornets for five seasons as Magic Barry, a name he also uses for his entertainment company, corporate game shows and magic act.

== Early start ==
Richards graduated from the University of Houston. He first danced at a Houston Rockets game in the 1975 NBA Playoffs. Richards had recently graduated from a Fred Astaire dance studio, where he received a deal for five lessons for $5. The Rockets' opponent was the New York Knicks, whose home games at Madison Square Garden featured Dancing Harry placing a whammy on the opposing team. Richards' friends encouraged him to be Harry's counterpart. In the first game of the series, the Knicks were being routed in the fourth quarter and called timeout; the band started to play. Avoiding security guards, Richards put on a foxtrot move and continued dancing and avoiding security through the entire song. After the song ended, he ripped open his shirt to display "DANCING BARRY" where Superman wears his "S". Dancing Barry became a mainstay at Houston Rockets games for the next four seasons. Interest in Richards' act dipped the following year, so he left his job as the corporate chef of an oil company and moved from Houston to New Jersey.

== Los Angeles career ==
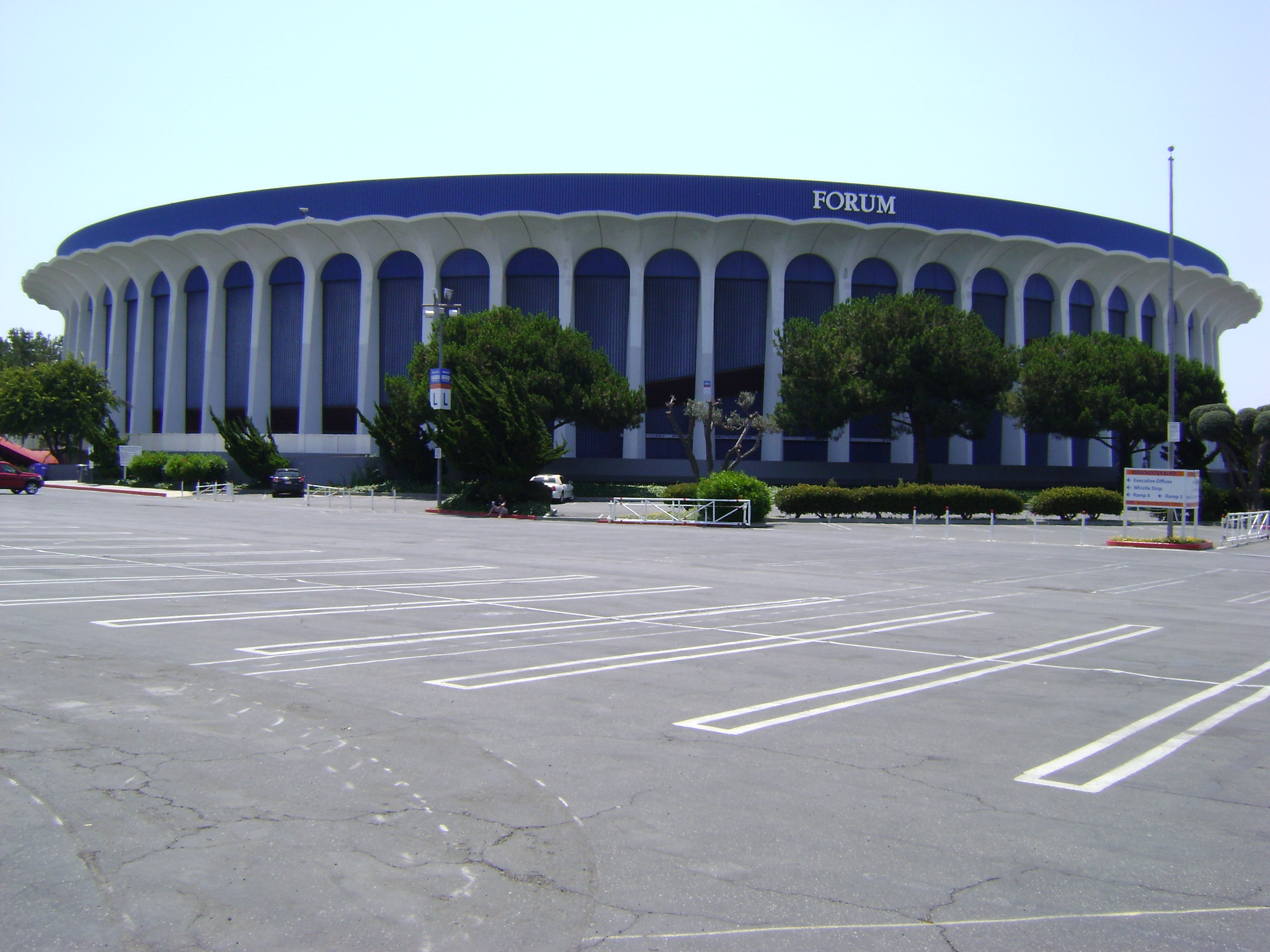
Dancing Barry performed at Lakers home games at The Forum.

Two years later, in 1982, Richards moved to Los Angeles and became a popcorn-machine salesman. The business was not successful, and he became a mortgage broker, as well as a part-time magician. A friend, who believed the Los Angeles Lakers's home crowd at The Forum was "laid back", convinced Richards to revive his Dancing Barry routine. On March 20, 1983, the Lakers called a timeout in the fourth quarter after a 17-point lead over the Dallas Mavericks had been reduced to one point. The band was playing "When the Saints Go Marching In", when Richards got up and danced. Lakers announcer Chick Hearn took notice of his performance, and the Lakers scored eight points in a row and won the game, 117–110.

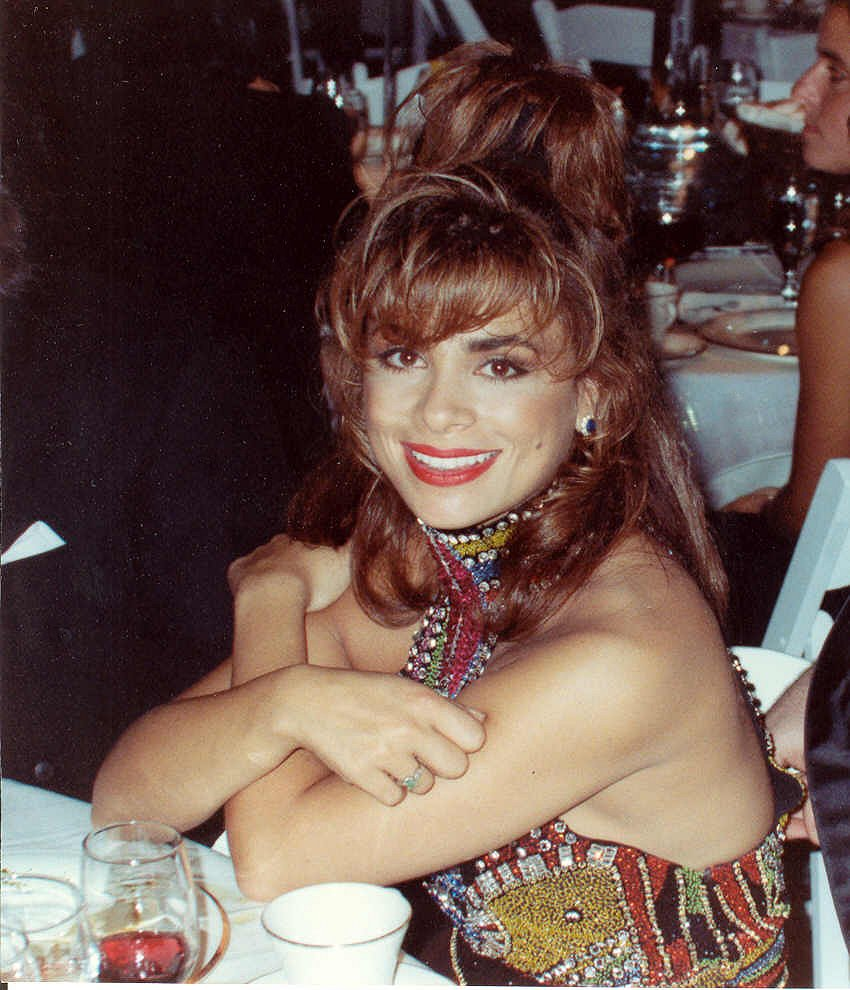
Dancing Barry sometimes performed with then-Laker Girl Paula Abdul.

For the following seven-plus seasons, Dancing Barry was a regular at Lakers games, usually performing in the second half. He was a staple of their Showtime era, and his tenure with the team included six NBA Finals appearances and championships in 1985, 1987 and 1988 for the Lakers. He no longer had to pay for tickets, and he was paid $35 a game during his first season with the Lakers, the same rate as the Laker Girls were paid. When the Los Angeles Clippers offered to pay him $200 a game, the Lakers matched the offer. He was perturbed that he never received another raise. He came up with new dance routines that required people to help, while paying them out of his own pocket.

Dancing Barry usually performed wearing sunglasses, and wore either an all-white or purple-and-gold tuxedo. Barry's energy frequently worked a quiet Forum crowd into a frenzy. During some broadcasts, Hearn credited him with firing up the crowd and the Lakers. Barry sometimes joined then-Laker Girl Paula Abdul in an on-court skit.

Dancing Barry performed again in Houston in a 1986 Finals game between the Rockets and the Boston Celtics, where he said he was accosted by a fan who called him a "traitor". Barry recalled his last appearance for the Lakers being a 15-point victory against the Chicago Bulls in January 1990. The games grew less fun for him, and he simply stopped going. Barry left bitter, and he said the Lakers never said goodbye. In 2007, he refused an invitation to attend a 20-year reunion of the Lakers 1987 championship when the Lakers denied his request for $2,000 and an airplane ticket. In 2014, sportswriter Jeff Pearlman said that Barry "saw himself as a bigger piece of the 'Showtime' puzzle than people want to give him credit for".

== Later years ==
Richards married and moved to Charlotte, North Carolina. He became a territorial sales representative and trainer for a veterinary laboratory, selling lab services and training vets on promoting their business. On the side he performed as Magic Barry, producing corporate game shows and performing close-up magic at both corporate and family events. He also danced at Charlotte Hornets games for five years, performing his Lakers' act under the name Magic Barry, before the team moved to New Orleans.
