= Justice Richards =

Justice Richards may refer to:

- Charles S. Richards (1878–1971), justice of the Delaware Supreme Court
- David Richards, Lord Richards of Camberwell (born 1951), justice of the Supreme Court of the United Kingdom
- Frederick Richards (judge) (1869-1957), justice of the Supreme Court of South Australia
- John E. Richards (1856–1932), associate justice of the California Supreme Court
- Paul W. Richards (judge) (1874–1956), justice of the Iowa Supreme Court
- Stephen Richards (judge) (born 1950), Lord Justice of Appeal of the High Court of Justice (Queen's Bench Division)

== See also ==
- Judge Richards (disambiguation)
