= Senator Richards =

Senator Richards may refer to:

- Graham Richard (born 1944), Indiana State Senate
- DeForest Richards (1846–1903), Wyoming State Senate
- Emerson Lewis Richards (1884–1963), New Jersey State Senate
- Frank H. Richards (1858–1937), Washington State Senate
- George Richards (Warren County, NY) (fl. 1840s–1850s), New York State Senate
- John K. Richards (1856–1909), Ohio State Senate
- John Richards (Pennsylvania politician) (1753–1822), Pennsylvania State Senate
- Lynn S. Richards (1901–2001), Utah State Senate
- Ralph Richards (1809–1883), New York State Senate
- Rees G. Richards (1842–1917), Ohio State Senate
- Vargrave Richards (born 1950), Senate of the U.S. Virgin Islands
- William L. Richards (1881–1941), Wisconsin State Senate
