= Craig Richards (footballer) =

Welsh footballer

Personal information
- Full name: Craig Alan Richards
- Date of birth: 10 October 1959 (age 67)
- Place of birth: Neath, Wales
- Position: Midfielder

Senior career*
Years	Team	Apps	(Gls)
1978–1979	Queens Park Rangers	0	(0)
1979–1980	Wimbledon	2	(0)
- * Club domestic league appearances and goals

Craig Alan Richards (born 10 October 1959) is a Welsh former professional footballer who played as a midfielder in the Football League.
