= Martin Richards (psychologist) =

British psychologist

Martin Paul Meredith Richards (born 26 January 1940) is a British psychologist, Professor of Family Research at the University of Cambridge from 1997 to 2005, and since emeritus.

Richards is the son of the botanist Paul Westmacott Richards.

== Publications ==
Books include:

- The Integration of a Child into a Social World (editor). Cambridge University Press. 1974.
- The Benefits of Hazards of the New Obstetrics (editor with T. Chard). Clinics in Developmental Medicine. 1977.
- Infancy. The World of the Newborn. Harper and Row. 1980.
- Divorce matters. (with J. Burgoyne and R. Ormrod). Penguin Books. 1987.
- The Politics of Maternity Care. (editor with J. Garcia and R. Kilpatrick). Oxford University Press. 1990.
- Sexual Arrangements: Marriage and Affairs. (with J. Reibstein). Heineman. 1992.
- The Troubled Helix: Social and Psychological Implications of the New Human Genetics. (editor with T. Marteau). Cambridge University Press. 1996.
- The Blackwell Companion to the Sociology of Families. (edited with J. Scott and J. Treas). Blackwell. 2003.
- Kinship Matters. (editor with F. Ebtehaj and B. Lindley). Hart. 2006.
- The Limits of Consent: A Socio-Ethical Approach to Human Subject Research in Medicine. (editor with O. Corrigan and others). Oxford University Press. 2009.
- Reproductive Donation: Practice, Policy and Bioethics. (ethics with G. Pennings and J. Appleby). Cambridge University Press. 2012.
- Relatedness in Assisted Reproduction: Families, Origins and Identities. (editor with T. Freeman, S. Graham, F. Ebtehaj). Cambridge University Press. 2014.
