= 2 Dy a Ni =

Welsh television programme

2 Dy a Ni (also Dau Dy a Ni) is a Welsh television programme produced by Boomerang for the Welsh television channel S4C in 2008, consisting of thirteen episodes. The show, a teenage drama, is set in a foster home in the South Wales Valleys. Shelley Rees plays Jo Pugh, one of the main characters, and was nominated for a Welsh BAFTA award. Dyfrig Morris (who also has a role in the film The Big I Am) plays the father. Carli De'La Hughes plays Sam the foster child, also known as Vicky Collins in Pobol y Cwm.
