= Dancing Harry =

American mascot

Marvin Cooper (Note: Most sources listed his name as Marvin Cooper, while The Indianapolis Star referred to him as Edward Cooper) (born c. 1943) is a former dancer who performed under the stage name Dancing Harry at professional basketball games. He danced on the sidelines during timeouts and gave whammies to the opposing team. Cooper performed in both the National Basketball Association (NBA) and the American Basketball Association (ABA) with the Baltimore Bullets, New York Knicks, New Jersey Nets and the Indiana Pacers.

== Early years ==
Cooper played basketball in high school at Mount Saint Joseph in Baltimore. In the locker room, he performed impersonations of Elvis Presley. One night, he was tricked by his friends to go on stage at a dance, where he performed "Hound Dog". His photo was placed in the school's yearbook with the caption: "Mt. St. Joe's Elvis Presley keeps the dance and swing."

Later, Cooper sang and danced as part of an eight-piece band that played in clubs around Baltimore. He became a fan of Earl Monroe while watching the Bullets player on television. When he had money or his mom bought him a ticket, he would attend their games.

== Dancing career ==
Dancing Harry first started dancing at basketball games around 1969. (Note: The New York Times wrote in a January 1973 article that his first game was three season ago, implying the 1969–70 season, while The Village Voice was unclear if it was on Easter Sunday in 1968.) The Baltimore crowd was dead, and he had been drinking a few beers when his friends convinced him to dance. While performing in Baltimore, he befriended Monroe. When Monroe moved to play for the Knicks, Cooper followed and brought his act to New York. Late in the 1971–72 season, Cooper asked the Knicks for permission to dance at their games, but he was denied. He went to a Knicks game anyway, arriving at halftime in a game that the Boston Celtics led by 20. The Knicks Willis Reed asked Cooper why he was not dancing. Cooper told him the front office did not approve. "The hell with the front office, Harry. Do something!'", Reed said.

Cooper started dancing, the crowd cheered, and the Knicks eventually won the game. Dancing Harry became a celebrity. He donned outlandish outfits with a black cap, a floppy cap or hat, and often had platform shoes. His hexes excited the crowd and distracted opponents, adding to the Knicks' already formidable home-court advantage. He never received any compensation from the Knicks. In 1973, the Knicks won an NBA championship, but rumors circulated during the playoffs that the Knicks front office was not crazy with Harry. Their owner, Ned Irish, was a traditionalist. When Cooper arrived for 1973–74 season, ushers at the Knicks home at Madison Square Garden told Cooper he could not dance, and he was ejected when he tried anyway.

Cooper took his act to Nassau Coliseum, where he was welcomed by the New Jersey Nets. With Dancing Harry performing, the Nets with star Julius Erving won the 1974 ABA championship. Harry also danced at some New York Yankees home games in 1974 at Shea Stadium while Yankee Stadium was undergoing renovations. Harry danced for another decade, including a move to Indianapolis, where he became the Indiana Pacers' first mascot and was paid nightly.

The New York Daily News called Harry a "trailblazer of sorts", even though he never danced for Portland, as nearly every NBA team by 2003 had a paid squad of dancers, providing entertainment other than basketball as part of the game experience. He also inspired Dancing Barry, who debuted at a Houston Rockets game against the Knicks in the 1975 NBA Playoffs.

== Later years ==
Cooper returned to Baltimore in the mid-1980s to care for his ailing mother. As of 2003, he worked as a skycap at Baltimore-Washington International Thurgood Marshall Airport.
