= P. W. Richards =

British botanist (1908–1995)

Paul Westmacott Richards CBE (9 December 1908 – 4 October 1995) was a British botanist.

== Life ==
Richard's father (Harold Meredith Richards (1864-1942)) was a civil servant medical administrator from a Welsh family. His mother, Mary (‘May’) Cecilia (née Todd, 1871-1941) was interested in plants, and he followed in her footsteps from childhood. He was especially keen on bryophytes and lichens. Richard was born in Walton-on-the-Hill, Surrey but when he was 3, the family moved back to Cardiff since his father took the post of deputy chairman of the Welsh Insurance Commission. His secondary school was Cardiff High School until 1920, when the family moved to London because his father now had a post at the Ministry of Health. Richards then attended the private University College School until 1925, and then University College London (1925-27) He joined the British Bryological Society in 1923.

A student at Trinity College, Cambridge, from 1927, after graduating he was a research fellow and then lecturer in botany. He participated in the 1929 Oxford University Expedition to Moraballi Creek in British Guiana, studying the tropical forest canopy. He was also part of the 1932 Oxford University Expedition to Baram in Sarawak, led by ex-Trinity undergraduate, ecologist Tom Harrisson. These experiences led to him being considered an authority on tropical rain-forests. He was the author of The Tropical Rain Forest (1952). This was considered the first modern book about the botany and ecology of rain forests since the 1930s, so they were little-known to science in the 1950s and the book had considerable influence.

In 1949 he moved from Cambridge to be Chair of Botany in the University College of North Wales, Bangor, and remained there until he retired in 1976.

He helped found the North Wales Naturalists’ Trust (now North Wales Wildlife Trust) in 1962 and chaired it from 1969 - 1972.

== Awards and honors ==
Richards chaired the Nature Conservancy’s Committee for Wales in 1956-7. He was president of the British Bryological Society (1950 - 1951 and 1978 - 1979) and of the British Ecological Society (1961 - 1963). He was appointed CBE for services to conservation. He was awarded the Linnean Medal in 1979.

== Personal life ==
He married Sarah Anne Hotham (1910-2007) in 1935 and they had 4 children together. One, Martin became a professor at Cambridge University. Richards moved back to live in Cambridge after he retired.

== Publications ==
P. W. Richards (1952) The Tropical Rain Forest
