= Todd Richards =

Todd Richards may refer to:

- Todd Richards (snowboarder) (born 1969), American snowboarder
- Todd Richards (ice hockey) (born 1966), American ice hockey player and coach
