= George Mather Richards =

American illustrator and painter

- Born: September 3, 1880; Darien, Connecticut
- Died: January 1958
- Education: Art
- Alma mater: Corcoran Art School, Williams College, Chase School
- Style: Illustration
- Spouse: Gertrude Lundborg

George Mather Richards (1880-1958) was an illustrator and painter in the 1900s. Throughout his career, he illustrated many textbooks and children's books. Richards is the illustrator of the widely produced 1918 World War I poster titled, "Oh, Boy! That's the Girl!"

== Early life and education ==
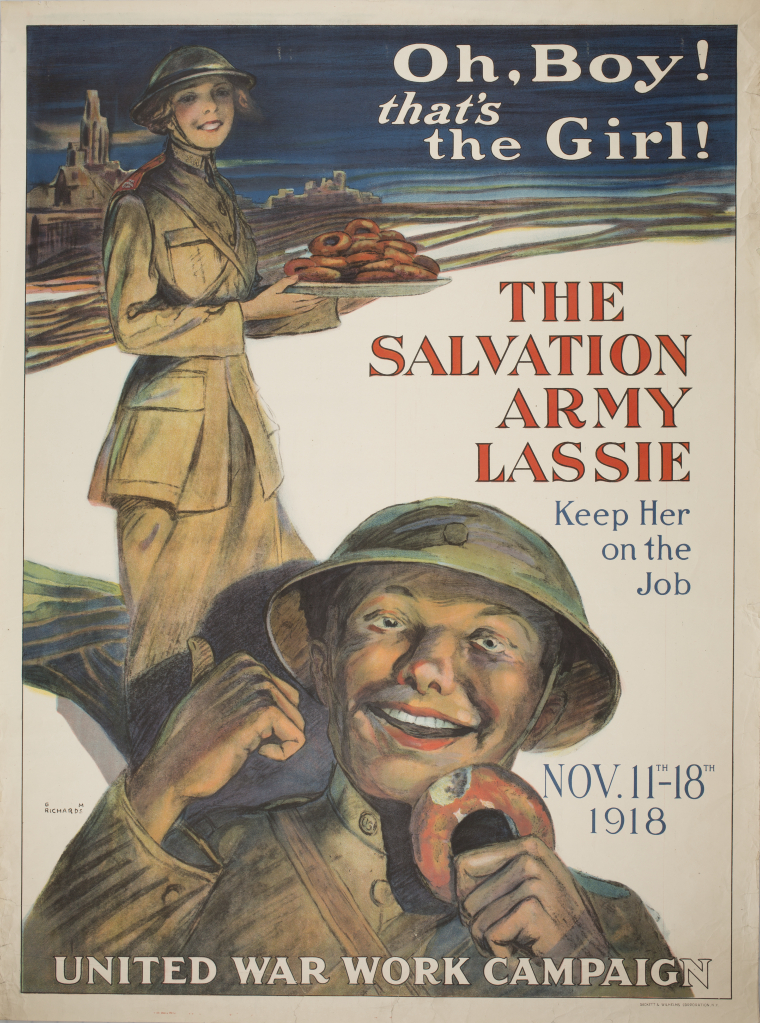
"Oh, Boy that's the Girl" (1918) designed by George M. Richards

Richards was born on September 3, 1880, in Darien, Connecticut, the son of Zalmon Richards and Mary Mather Richards. He came from a line of scholars and educators.

His art education began at the Corcoran Art School in Washington, D.C. In 1904, Richards graduated Phi Beta Kappa and with honors from Williams College, where he was a member of Delta Upsilon fraternity, following in the footsteps of his father, who was one of the members who founded the organization at Williams in 1834. He then studied at The Chase School in New York City. Richards studied under Robert Henri, Edward Penfield, and D.J. Connah. He also met his future wife, Gertrude Lundborg of Kansas, at the art school. During this time, Richards illustrated college annuals and cover designs for magazines.

== Career ==
Richards was the art director at Everybody's Magazine in New York. He left the position in 1914. Afterwards, he worked as a freelance illustrator. Much of his work was done for MacMillan & Company. Throughout this period, Richards illustrated historical textbooks, children's books, books of poetry, and posters.

In 1918, Richards designed the World War I poster, "Oh, Boy! That's the Girl!" It was published by Sackett & Wihlems for The Salvation Army. The poster features a woman holding plate of doughnuts and a "Doughboy" eating a donut. He urges viewers to keep the "Lassies" on the job by donating to The Salvation Army. Lassies were women of The Salvation Army who performed duties like writing letters home, praying over fallen soldiers, and making doughnuts for the soldiers.

Richards exhibited his work for the MacDowell Club Exhibitions in 1917. In June 1919, Richards and Lundborg exhibited their artwork at the Paint Box Gallery. Richards' paintings, "Flame" and "Rain" were showcased at the Independent Artists show.

During his career, Richards was a part of various art societies including, the Salmagundi Club of New York, Society of Independent Artists, and the Silvermine Artists Guild. He joined the latter guild in 1930.

As of 1919, Richards and Gertrude Lundborg were living at 112 West 11th Street in New York City.

Richards retired in Winter Park, Florida, and died in January 1958.

== Friendship with Nicholas Vachel Lindsay ==
While he was a student at Chase School, Richards met poet Nicholas Vachel Lindsay. The two were roommates in New York and became lifelong friends. Vachel described Richards as looking, "cold, sleek,...panther-like" and like "Prince Regent of China." He was also described as being well-read and interested in the Middle Ages, often drawing pictures of ladies and knights. Later in life, Vachel would write to a friend that Richards was his "heart's best brother for [his] four years (1905-1908)."

Richards illustrated a few of Lindsay's poetry books including, Johnny Appleseed and Other Poems (1928), Every Soul is a Circus (1929), and the cover of The Golden Book of Springfield (1920). Richards' drawings even influenced Lindsay's poems, "The Queen of Butterflies" and "The Mysterious Cat." Vachel's "Art of the Moving Picture" is dedicated to Richards with the inscription, "Dedicated to George Mather Richards in memory of the art student days we spent together when the Metropolitan Museum was our picture-drama."

Vachel would go on to write a poem for Richards' daughter, Elisabet "Betsy," titled, "Some Balloons Grow on Trees."
