= Dick Richards (journalist) =

Dick Richards was a journalist who covered entertainment and showbusiness matters, sometimes in a Sunday Pictorial column called 'The Bright Lights'.

He appeared as a castaway on the BBC Radio programme Desert Island Discs on 8 March 1965.

In 2012 a collection of photographs was found in a house clearance, showing Richards in the company of stars such as Charlie Chaplin, Burt Lancaster, Marilyn Monroe, Ginger Rogers, Frank Sinatra, and David Niven.

== Bibliography ==
- —— (1949). The Life Story of Danny Kaye. Convoy Publications.
- —— (1950). Sunday Pictorial All-star Annual. The Sunday Pictorial. (as editor)
- —— (1969). Ginger Rogers: Salute to a Star. Clifton Books. ISBN 978-0901255075.
