= Fred Richards =

Fred Richards may refer to:

- Frederic M. Richards (1925–2009), professor of molecular biophysics and biochemistry at Yale University
- Fred Richards (baseball) (1927–2016), American baseball player
- Frederick Richards (1833–1912), admiral of the fleet
- Frederick Richards (judge) (1869–1957), Australian jurist

== See also ==
- Fred Richard (born 2004), American artistic gymnast
