= Midvale Park =

Master planned community in Tucson, Arizona

Coordinates: 32.148385°N 110.998863°W

Midvale Park is a master planned community in the southwest part of Tucson, Arizona. Originally developed in 1982, Midvale Park officially comprises 3550 homes, two parks, and a public elementary school. The development is bordered by Interstate 19 on the east, Mission Road to the west, Irvington Road to the north, and Valencia Road to the south.

== Education ==
Midvale Park has an elementary school, Raul Grijalva Elementary School, which is part of the Tucson Unified School District. It is named after U.S. Congressman Raul M. Grijalva, who represents the 3rd Congressional District of Arizona.

== Parks ==
Midvale Park has several parks including Sarah Ann Miller Park and Grijalva Park.
