= Ron Richards =

Ron or Ronald Richards may refer to:

- Ron Richards (boxer) (1910–1967), indigenous Australian boxer of the 1930s and 1940s
- Ron Richards (footballer, born 1928) (1928–2013), Australian rules footballer for Collingwood
- Ron Richards (footballer, born 1927), Australian rules footballer for Footscray
- Ron Richards (producer) (1929–2009), British record producer, best known for discovering The Hollies
- Ron Richards (ski jumper) (born 1963), Canadian ski jumper
- Ronald Richards (bishop) (1908–1994), Australian Anglican bishop
- Ronald Richards (lawyer), American lawyer
- George Ronald Richards (1905–1985), known as Ron Richards, police officer and deputy director-general of the Australian Security Intelligence Organisation
