= Matthew Richards (pianist) =

English pianist

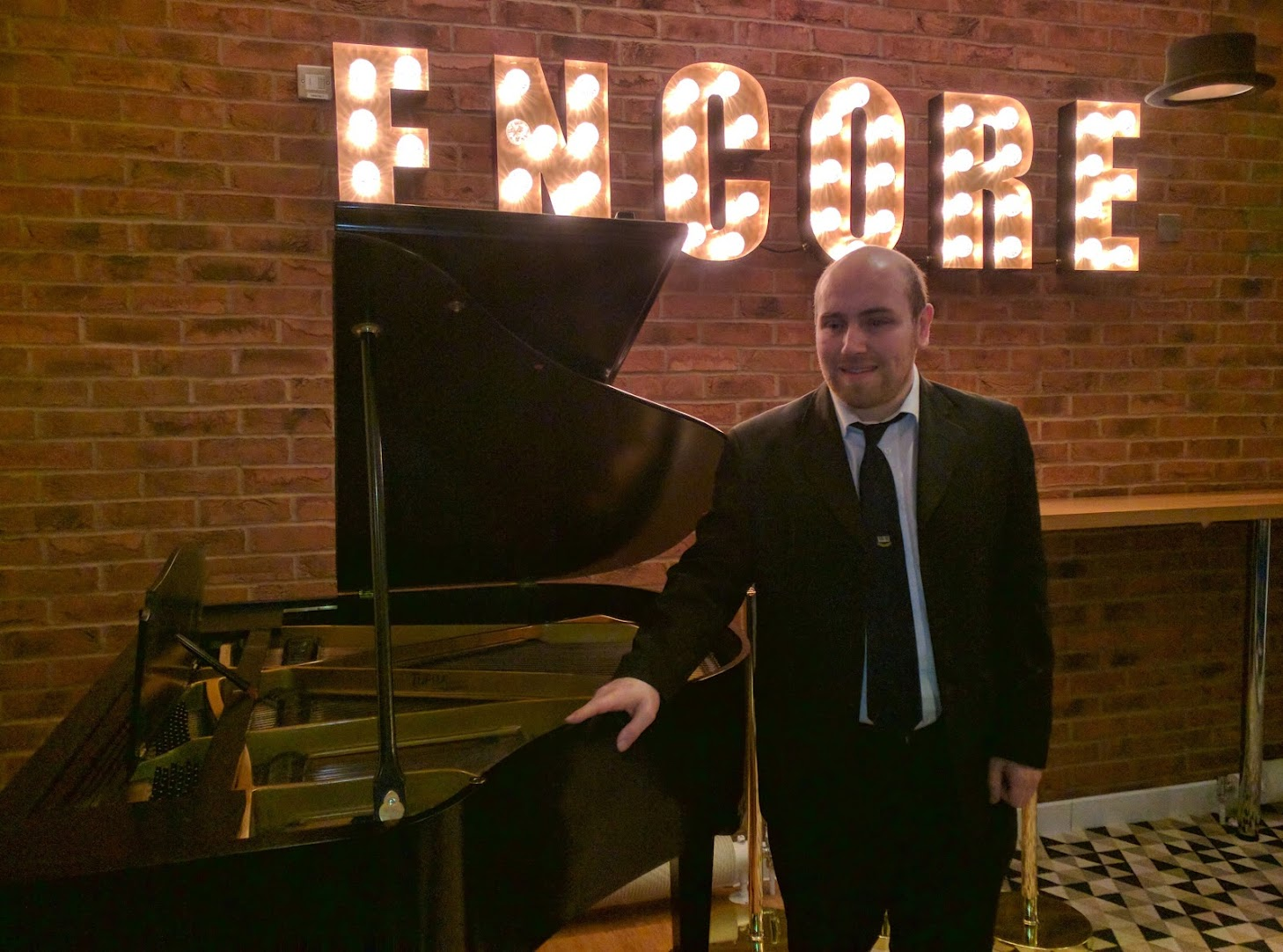
- Richards performing at The Grand Theatre Wolverhampton, c. 2017
- Born: 22 March 1988 (age 38); Wolverhampton
- Occupations: Pianist, piano tuner, ukulele player, composer
- Website: www.matthewjamesrichards.co.uk

Matthew James Richards is an English pianist based in Wolverhampton, England.

== Early life and education ==
Richards has perfect pitch, which he discovered at age 5. Born partially sighted,. He attended the Royal National College for the Blind in which he studied Piano tuning.

== Musical career ==
Richards also plays the ukulele, and has performed the music of George Formby, nostalgia entertainment and singalong songs.

He is the musical director of the George Formby Society, and was made an honorary member by the mayor of Blackpool in 2021.

During the COVID-19 pandemic, Richards hosted virtual Zoom meetings to allow members to perform together during the lockdown of 2020. He put together videos of all the members performing George Formby songs on YouTube that gained news coverage.

Richards was featured on Channel 4's series The Piano. He released an album featuring his original composition "Tide of Dreams", which he performed on the show.

He regularly performs a "musical memories" concert featuring piano and ukulele. For the 80th anniversary of VE Day, he performed a series of memorial concerts.

In 2025, Richards arranged and composed the theme tune for the Black Country talking news drama Leeford Village.

His compositions have been featured on BBC Radio 3 Unwind's The Sleeping Forecast.
