= Chris Richards (Australian footballer) =

Australian rules footballer

Personal information
- Full name: Christopher Richards
- Born: 14 July 1882; Melbourne, Victoria
- Died: 23 August 1971 (aged 89); Bankstown, New South Wales

Playing career^{1}
Years	Club	Games (Goals)
1903	South Melbourne	1 (1)
- ^{1} Playing statistics correct to the end of 1903.

Christopher Richards (14 July 1882 – 23 August 1971) was an Australian rules footballer who played with South Melbourne in the Victorian Football League (VFL).
