= Nathaniel Richards =

Nathaniel Richards may refer to:

- Nathaniel Richards (Marvel Comics), a Marvel Comics character
- Nathaniel Richards (settler) (1604–1681), founding settler of Hartford and Norwalk, Connecticut
- Nathanael Richards (fl. 1630–1654), English dramatist and poet
