= Anthony D. Richards =

English footballer

Personal information
- Full name: Anthony D. Richards
- Place of birth: England
- Position: Winger

Senior career*
Years	Team	Apps	(Gls)
1894–1895	Stourbridge		
1895–1896	The Wednesday	7	(1)
Total		7	(1)
- * Club domestic league appearances and goals

Anthony D. Richards was an English footballer who played in the Football League for The Wednesday.
