= Tony Richards =

Tony Richards may refer to:

- Tony Richards (musician) (1957–2026), American drummer
- Tony Richards (author), English dark fantasy and horror author
- Tony Richards (footballer, born 1934) (1934–2010), English footballer for Walsall and Port Vale
- Tony Richards (footballer, born 1944), English footballerfor Mansfield Town
- Tony Richards (footballer, born 1973), English footballer for Barnet, Cambridge United, Leyton Orient and Southend United
