= George Jacob Richards =

US Army general

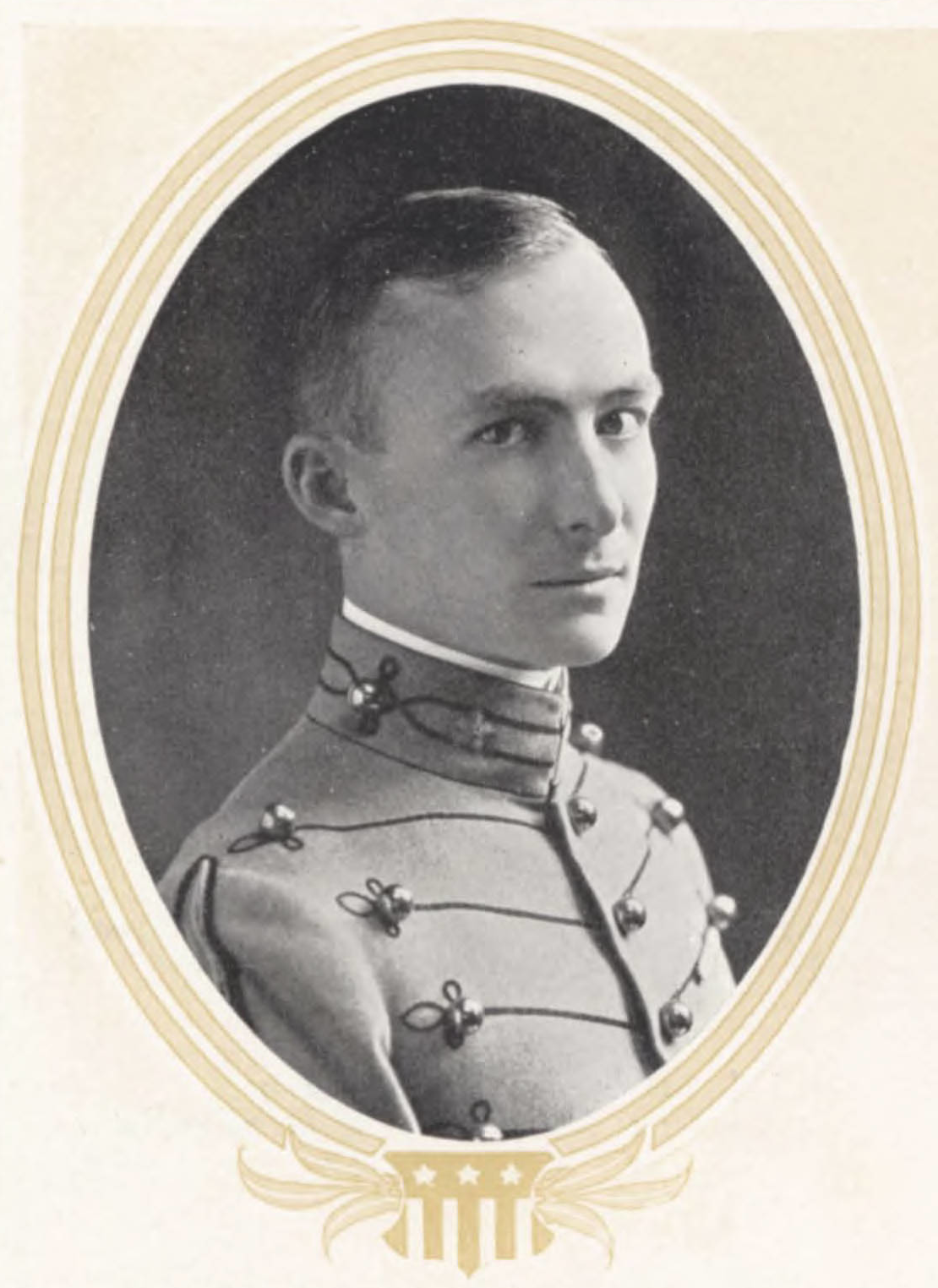
- At West Point in 1915
- Born: April 12, 1891; Easton, Pennsylvania, United States
- Died: October 1, 1984 (aged 93); Doylestown, Pennsylvania, United States
- Burial place: Arlington National Cemetery, Virginia, United States
- Military career
- Allegiance: United States
- Branch: United States Army
- Service years: 1915−1953
- Rank: Major General
- Service number: 0-3771
- Unit: United States Army Corps of Engineers
- Conflicts: World War I World War II
- Awards: Army Distinguished Service Medal; Legion of Merit

Major General George Jacob Richards (April 12, 1891 – October 1, 1984) was a United States Army officer who was a recipient of the Army Distinguished Service Medal and the Legion of Merit during World War II. He was buried in Arlington National Cemetery.

Commissioned into the United States Army Corps of Engineers in June 1915, he served in the United States during World War I and, during the interwar period, he attended the Naval War College from July 1937 to March 1938.
