= George Richards (Attorney General) =

Senator George A. Richards served as the first post-independence Attorney General of Trinidad and Tobago from 1962 to 1967. Born in the neighboring Caribbean Island of St Vincent, he first attended the Belmont Boys R.C. Primary School then went on to study abroad at the Tutorial College, London and the University of London, where he studied Law and was called to the Bar in 1940. After studying in London Mr. Richards returned to Trinidad and Tobago and became a member of the San Fernando Borough Council. He was the Foundation member of the West Indian National Party in 1942.

Richards was the father of the former President of Trinidad and Tobago, George Maxwell Richards.
