= 1941 in British radio =

This is a list of events from British radio in 1941.

== Events ==
=== January ===
- 14 January – In a BBC radio broadcast from London, Victor de Laveleye asks all Belgians to use the "V sign" as a rallying sign, being the first letter of victoire (victory) in French and of vrijheid (freedom) in Dutch, the beginning of a subversive campaign which spreads across occupied Europe.

=== February ===
- February – BBC begins construction of an emergency broadcasting facility in the disused tunnel of the Clifton Rocks Railway in Bristol.

=== March ===
- 17 March – The BBC European service moves its London headquarters from a temporary home in Maida Vale Studios to Bush House.

=== April ===
- April – The BBC begins to broadcast its first soap opera, Front Line Family, on its newly-created shortwave North American Service, intended as soft propaganda to the (at this time) neutral United States.

=== May ===
- May – Arthur Bliss joins the BBC's overseas music service.
- 10 May – London's Queen's Hall, venue for the BBC Proms, is bombed by the Luftwaffe. The Proms re-locate to the Royal Albert Hall.
- 23 May – Gustav Siegfried Eins, a British black propaganda station, begins broadcasting to German troops in Western Europe from a studio at Wavendon in Buckinghamshire through short wave transmitters at Gawcott and Potsgrove, purporting to be an official German military station.

=== June ===
- 28 June – The first of four broadcasts from Berlin to the neutral United States by English-born humorist P. G. Wodehouse, who has been interned in Nazi Germany, is made. The series, entitled How to be an Internee Without Previous Training and comprising anecdotes about Wodehouse's experiences as a civilian internee, including some gentle mocking of his captors, is in August broadcast to the United Kingdom by the German propaganda ministry. The broadcasts generate a reaction, including, on 15 July, a strongly worded riposte on the BBC by print journalist William Connor. A 1944 official British investigation finds Wodehouse's actions to be no worse than "unwise" but he will never return to the UK.

=== July ===
- No events.

=== August ===
- 6 August – C. S. Lewis begins a series of BBC radio broadcasts that will be adapted as Mere Christianity.

=== September ===
- No events.

=== October ===
- 14 October – BBC programmes are first interrupted by Nazi German propaganda transmissions.

=== November ===
- November – Yorkshireman Wilfred Pickles first reads the national news bulletin, in his regional accent.

=== December ===
- 21 December – The BBC Home Service begins broadcasting The Man Born to Be King, a series of 12 plays written by Dorothy L. Sayers based on the life of Jesus and noted for being presented in contemporary colloquial English. Produced by Val Gielgud, with Robert Speaight as Jesus, the series is broadcast at monthly intervals.
- 30 December – The Brains Trust first broadcast as Any Questions? on the BBC Home Service.

=== Undated ===
- Bandleader Jack Payne returns to the post of Director of Dance Music at the BBC. This year also the BBC appoints Geraldo's as another of its house bands.

== Debuts ==
- 9 February – The Happidrome (BBC) (1941–1947)
- April – Front Line Family (BBC North America Service) (1941–1948)
- 30 July – BBC Dancing Club (BBC Forces Programme)
- 21 December – The Man Born to Be King (BBC Home Service) (1941–1942)
- Sincerely Yours, presented by Vera Lynn (BBC)

== Continuing radio programmes ==
=== 1930s ===
- In Town Tonight (1933–1960)

=== 1940s ===
- Music While You Work (1940–1967)
- Sunday Half Hour (1940–2018)

== Births ==
- January – John Rowe, actor
- 24 March – Humphrey Barclay, comedy producer
- 10 May – Chris Denning, presenter and sex offender
- 27 June – Christopher Bigsby, British academic expert on American drama and radio arts presenter
- 7 July – Bill Oddie, comedy writer-performer, songwriter and birder (died 2026)
- 20 July – Ed Doolan, Australian-born presenter (died 2018)
- 28 July – Peter Marinker, voice actor
- 4 August – Martin Jarvis, voice and stage actor
- 30 August – Sue MacGregor, presenter
- 13 October – Christopher Lee, BBC News correspondent, historian and radio documentary writer (died 2021)
- 5 December – Sheridan Morley, theatrical critic/biographer and broadcaster (died 2007)

== See also ==
- 1941 in British music
- 1941 in British television
- 1941 in the United Kingdom
- List of British films of 1941
