= 1941 in film =

The year 1941 in film involved some significant events, in particular the release of a film consistently rated as one of the greatest of all time, Citizen Kane.

== Events ==
- January 17 – A film based on the best-selling novel Gone with the Wind goes into general release in the United States after touring in a roadshow version during 1940. Becoming a cultural phenomenon, it sells an estimated 60 million tickets this year alone. Adjusted for inflation with numerous rereleases, it remains the highest grossing domestic film of all time with $1.6 billion.
- March 24 – Glenn Miller begins work on his orchestra's first movie Sun Valley Serenade for Twentieth Century Fox.
- May 1 – Orson Welles' Citizen Kane, consistently rated as one of the films considered the all-time best, is premiered at the Palace Theatre (New York City).
- June – An Airman's Letter to His Mother, a British propaganda film based on true events, is released in cinemas, directed by Michael Powell and narrated by John Gielgud.
- July 2 – Sergeant York, the film biopic of World War I hero Alvin C. York, starring Gary Cooper in the title role, premieres in New York City. It is the highest-grossing picture of the year and earns Cooper the first of two Academy Awards for Best Actor.
- July 28 - The assets of Hollywood studios in Japan are frozen by Japan's Ministry of Finance.
- September – Senate Investigation into Motion Picture War Propaganda in the United States.
- October 3 – The Maltese Falcon, considered one of the greatest films noir, is released.

== Academy Awards ==
- Best Picture: How Green Was My Valley – 20th Century-Fox
- Best Actor: Gary Cooper – Sergeant York
- Best Actress: Joan Fontaine – Suspicion
- Best Supporting Actor: Donald Crisp – How Green Was My Valley
- Best Supporting Actress: Mary Astor – The Great Lie
- Best Director: John Ford – How Green Was My Valley

== Top-grossing films (U.S.) ==
The top ten 1941 released films by box office gross in North America are as follows:

Highest-grossing films of 1941
Rank	Title	Distributor	Domestic rentals
1	Sergeant York	Warner Bros.	$6,075,000
2	Honky Tonk	MGM	$2,893,000
3	Louisiana Purchase	Paramount	$2,750,000
4	How Green Was My Valley	20th Century Fox	$2,447,000
5	The Philadelphia Story	MGM	$2,374,000
6	Caught in the Draft	Paramount	$2,200,000
7	A Yank in the R.A.F.	20th Century Fox	$2,063,000
8	Men of Boys Town	MGM	$2,009,000
9	Ziegfeld Girl	MGM	$1,891,000
10	They Died with Their Boots On	Warner Bros.	$1,871,000

== Films by country/region ==
- Argentina
- Australia
- Austria
- Brazil
- Canada
- China
- Czechoslovakia
- Denmark
- Finland
- France
- Germany
- India
- Italy
- Japan
- Mexico
- Netherlands
- Norway
- Poland
- Portugal
- Soviet Union
- Spain
- Sweden
- United Kingdom
- United States

== Notable films ==
Films produced in the United States unless stated otherwise

=== # ===
- The 47 Ronin (Genroku Chūshingura), directed by Kenji Mizoguchi – (Japan)
- 49th Parallel, directed by Michael Powell, starring Leslie Howard, Laurence Olivier and Raymond Massey – (GB)

=== A ===
- Adam Had Four Sons, directed by Gregory Ratoff, starring Ingrid Bergman and Warner Baxter
- Among the Living, directed by Stuart Heisler, starring Albert Dekker, Susan Hayward and Harry Carey
- Andy Hardy's Private Secretary, directed by George B. Seitz, starring Lewis Stone, Mickey Rooney and Fay Holden

=== B ===
- Babes on Broadway, directed by Busby Berkeley, starring Mickey Rooney and Judy Garland
- Back Street, directed by Robert Stevenson, starring Charles Boyer and Margaret Sullavan
- Ball of Fire, directed by Howard Hawks, starring Gary Cooper and Barbara Stanwyck
- The Big Store, directed by Charles Reisner, starring the Marx Brothers and Tony Martin
- The Black Cat, directed by Albert S. Rogell, starring Basil Rathbone and Bela Lugosi
- Blood and Sand, directed by Rouben Mamoulian, starring Tyrone Power, Linda Darnell and Rita Hayworth
- Blossoms in the Dust, directed by Mervyn LeRoy, starring Greer Garson and Walter Pidgeon
- Blues in the Night, directed by Anatole Litvak, starring Priscilla Lane
- The Bride Came C.O.D., directed by William Keighley, starring James Cagney and Bette Davis
- Brothers and Sisters of the Toda Family (Toda-ke no kyōdai), directed by Yasujirō Ozu – (Japan)
- Buck Privates, directed by Arthur Lubin, starring Abbott and Costello and the Andrews Sisters

=== C ===
- Caught in the Draft, directed by David Butler, starring Bob Hope and Dorothy Lamour
- Charlie Chan in Rio, directed by Harry Lachman, starring Sidney Toler
- Charley's Aunt, directed by Archie Mayo, starring Jack Benny and Kay Francis
- The Chocolate Soldier, directed by Roy Del Ruth, starring Nelson Eddy and Risë Stevens
- Citizen Kane, directed by and starring Orson Welles, with Joseph Cotten and Agnes Moorehead
- The Corsican Brothers, directed by Gregory Ratoff, starring Douglas Fairbanks Jr.
- Cottage to Let, directed by Anthony Asquith, starring Leslie Banks, Alastair Sim and John Mills – (GB)

=== D ===
- The Devil and Daniel Webster, directed by William Dieterle, starring Edward Arnold and Walter Huston
- The Devil and Miss Jones, directed by Sam Wood, starring Jean Arthur, Robert Cummings and Charles Coburn
- Dr. Jekyll and Mr. Hyde, directed by Victor Fleming, starring Spencer Tracy, Ingrid Bergman and Lana Turner
- Dumbo, Disney Classic directed by Ben Sharpsteen

=== F ===
- The Face Behind the Mask, directed by Robert Florey, starring Peter Lorre
- Footsteps in the Dark, directed by Lloyd Bacon, starring Errol Flynn
- The Flame of New Orleans, directed by René Clair, starring Marlene Dietrich

=== G ===
- The Ghost of St. Michael's, directed by Marcel Varnel, starring Will Hay and Charles Hawtrey – (GB)
- The Great Lie, directed by Edmund Goulding, starring Mary Astor, George Brent and Bette Davis

=== H ===
- H.M. Pulham, Esq., directed by King Vidor, starring Hedy Lamarr and Robert Young
- Hellzapoppin', directed by H. C. Potter, starring Ole Olsen, Chic Johnson and Martha Raye
- Here Comes Mr. Jordan, directed by Alexander Hall, starring Robert Montgomery and Claude Rains
- High Sierra, directed by Raoul Walsh, starring Ida Lupino and Humphrey Bogart
- Hold Back the Dawn, directed by Mitchell Leisen, starring Charles Boyer, Olivia de Havilland and Paulette Goddard
- Hold That Ghost, directed by Arthur Lubin, starring Abbott and Costello, the Andrews Sisters and Ted Lewis
- Honky Tonk, directed by Jack Conway, starring Clark Gable and Lana Turner
- How Green Was My Valley, directed by John Ford, starring Walter Pidgeon, Maureen O'Hara and Roddy McDowall

=== I ===
- I Wake Up Screaming, directed by H. Bruce Humberstone, starring Betty Grable, Victor Mature and Carole Landis
- In the Navy, directed by Arthur Lubin, starring Abbott and Costello, Dick Powell and the Andrews Sisters
- It Started with Eve, directed by Henry Koster, starring Deanna Durbin, Charles Laughton and Robert Cummings

=== K ===
- Kathleen, directed by Harold S. Bucquet, starring Shirley Temple and Herbert Marshall
- Keep 'Em Flying, directed by Arthur Lubin, starring Abbott and Costello and Martha Raye
- Khazanchi (Cashier), directed by Moti B. Gidwani – (India)
- Kipps, directed by Carol Reed, starring Michael Redgrave – (GB)

=== L ===
- Ladies in Retirement, directed by Charles Vidor, starring Ida Lupino and Louis Hayward
- Lady Be Good, directed by Norman Z. McLeod, starring Eleanor Powell, Ann Sothern, Robert Young, Lionel Barrymore and Red Skelton
- The Lady Eve, directed by Preston Sturges, starring Barbara Stanwyck and Henry Fonda
- Life Begins for Andy Hardy, directed by George B. Seitz, starring Lewis Stone, Mickey Rooney, Fay Holden and Judy Garland
- The Little Foxes, directed by William Wyler, starring Bette Davis and Herbert Marshall
- Louisiana Purchase, directed by Irving Cummings, starring Bob Hope
- Love on the Dole, directed by John Baxter, starring Deborah Kerr – (GB)

=== M ===
- Major Barbara, directed by Gabriel Pascal, starring Wendy Hiller and Rex Harrison – (GB)
- The Maltese Falcon, directed by John Huston, starring Humphrey Bogart, Mary Astor and Peter Lorre
- Man Hunt, directed by Fritz Lang, starring Walter Pidgeon, Joan Bennett and George Sanders
- Man-Made Monster, directed by George Waggner, starring Lon Chaney Jr. and Lionel Atwill
- Manpower, directed by Raoul Walsh, starring Edward G. Robinson, Marlene Dietrich and George Raft
- Meet John Doe, directed by Frank Capra, starring Gary Cooper and Barbara Stanwyck
- Men of Boys Town, directed by Norman Taurog, starring Spencer Tracy and Mickey Rooney
- Moon Over Miami, directed by Walter Lang, starring Don Ameche, Betty Grable and Robert Cummings
- Mr. & Mrs. Smith, directed by Alfred Hitchcock, starring Carole Lombard, Robert Montgomery and Gene Raymond
- Mr. Bug Goes to Town, animated film directed by Dave Fleischer

=== N ===
- Never Give a Sucker an Even Break, directed by Edward F. Cline, starring W. C. Fields
- Nice Girl?, directed by William A. Seiter, starring Deanna Durbin, Franchot Tone, Walter Brennan and Robert Stack

=== O ===
- Ohm Krüger (Uncle Kruger), propaganda film directed by Hans Steinhoff, starring Emil Jannings – (Germany)
- One Foot in Heaven, directed by Irving Rapper, starring Fredric March and Martha Scott

=== P ===
- Penny Serenade, directed by George Stevens, starring Irene Dunne and Cary Grant
- Piccolo mondo antico (Old-Fashioned World), directed by Mario Soldati, starring Alida Valli – (Italy)
- Pimpernel Smith, propaganda film directed by and starring Leslie Howard – (GB)
- Princess Iron Fan (Tiě shàn gōngzhǔ), directed by Wan Guchan and Wan Laiming – (China)

=== R ===
- Rage in Heaven, directed by W. S. Van Dyke, starring Robert Montgomery, Ingrid Bergman and George Sanders
- The Reluctant Dragon, directed by Alfred L. Werker, starring Robert Benchley
- Road to Zanzibar, directed by Victor Schertzinger, starring Bing Crosby, Bob Hope and Dorothy Lamour

=== S ===
- The Sea Wolf, directed by Michael Curtiz, starring Edward G. Robinson, Ida Lupino and John Garfield
- Sergeant York, directed by Howard Hawks, starring Gary Cooper and Walter Brennan
- Shadow of the Thin Man, directed by W. S. Van Dyke, starring William Powell and Myrna Loy
- The Shanghai Gesture, directed by Josef von Sternberg, starring Gene Tierney, Walter Huston and Victor Mature
- The Shepherd of the Hills, directed by Henry Hathaway, starring John Wayne and Harry Carey
- Skylark, directed by Mark Sandrich, starring Claudette Colbert and Ray Milland
- Spooks Run Wild, directed by Phil Rosen, starring Bela Lugosi and the East Side Kids
- Stormy Waters (Remorques), directed by Jean Grémillon, starring Jean Gabin and Michèle Morgan – (France)
- The Strawberry Blonde, directed by Raoul Walsh, starring James Cagney, Olivia de Havilland and Rita Hayworth
- Sullivan's Travels, directed by Preston Sturges, starring Joel McCrea and Veronica Lake
- Sun Valley Serenade, directed by H. Bruce Humberstone, starring Sonja Henie, John Payne and Glenn Miller
- Suspicion, directed by Alfred Hitchcock, starring Cary Grant and Joan Fontaine
- Swamp Water, directed by Jean Renoir, starring Walter Brennan, Walter Huston, Anne Baxter and Dana Andrews

=== T ===
- Target for Tonight, a propaganda documentary directed by Harry Watt – (GB)
- Tarzan's Secret Treasure, directed by Richard Thorpe, starring Johnny Weissmuller and Maureen O'Sullivan
- That Hamilton Woman, directed by Alexander Korda, starring Vivien Leigh and Laurence Olivier – (GB)
- That Night in Rio, directed by Irving Cummings, starring Alice Faye, Don Ameche and Carmen Miranda
- They Died with Their Boots On, directed by Raoul Walsh, starring Errol Flynn and Olivia de Havilland
- Tobacco Road, directed by John Ford, starring Charley Grapewin, Marjorie Rambeau and Gene Tierney

=== W ===
- Week-End in Havana, directed by Walter Lang, starring Alice Faye, Carmen Miranda, John Payne and Cesar Romero
- Western Union, directed by Fritz Lang, starring Robert Young and Randolph Scott
- When Ladies Meet, directed by Robert Z. Leonard, starring Joan Crawford, Robert Taylor, Greer Garson and Herbert Marshall
- The Wolf Man, directed by George Waggner, starring Lon Chaney Jr., Claude Rains, Warren William and Ralph Bellamy
- A Woman's Face, directed by George Cukor, starring Joan Crawford, Melvyn Douglas and Conrad Veidt

=== Y ===
- A Yank in the R.A.F., directed by Henry King, starring Tyrone Power and Betty Grable
- You Belong to Me, directed by Wesley Ruggles, starring Barbara Stanwyck and Henry Fonda
- You'll Never Get Rich, directed by Sidney Lanfield, starring Fred Astaire and Rita Hayworth

=== Z ===
- Ziegfeld Girl, directed by Robert Z. Leonard, starring James Stewart, Judy Garland, Hedy Lamarr and Lana Turner

== 1941 film releases ==
United States unless stated

=== January–March ===
- January 1941
  - 1 January
    - Princess Iron Fan (China)
  - 16 January
    - The Face Behind the Mask
  - 17 January
    - The Philadelphia Story
  - 21 January
    - High Sierra
  - 23 January
    - Suvorov
  - 24 January
    - Life with Henry
    - The Saint in Palm Springs
  - 28 January
    - Sullivan's Travels
  - 31 January
    - Buck Privates
    - Mr. & Mrs. Smith
- February 1941
  - 7 February
    - Back Street
  - 18 February
    - Adam Had Four Sons
  - 20 February
    - Tobacco Road
  - 21 February
    - Andy Hardy's Private Secretary
    - Nice Girl?
    - The Strawberry Blonde
    - Western Union
  - 25 February
    - The Lady Eve
- March 1941
  - 1 March
    - Brothers and Sisters of the Toda Family (Japan)
  - 7 March
    - Rage in Heaven
  - 8 March
    - Footsteps in the Dark
  - 10 March
    - Flying Wild
  - 21 March
    - The Sea Wolf
  - 26 March
    - I Wanted Wings
  - 28 March
    - Man Made Monster

=== April–June ===
- April 1941
  - 4 April
    - The Devil and Miss Jones
    - Ohm Krüger (Germany)
  - 6 April
    - The Flame of New Orleans
  - 10 April
    - Piccolo mondo antico (Italy)
  - 11 April
    - Road to Zanzibar
    - That Night in Rio
  - 12 April
    - The Great Lie
  - 19 April
    - The Farmer's Wife (Britain)
    - Hatter's Castle (Britain)
    - Quiet Wedding (GB)
  - 24 April
    - Crook's Tour (Britain)
    - Penny Serenade
  - 25 April
    - They Met in Argentina
    - Ziegfeld Girl
  - 30 April
    - That Hamilton Woman (GB)
- May 1941
  - 1 May
    - Citizen Kane
  - 2 May
    - The Black Cat
  - 3 May
    - Meet John Doe
  - 5 May
    - Inspector Hornleigh Goes To It (GB)
  - 7 May
    - Sheriff of Tombstone
  - 9 May
    - U-Boat Course West! (Germany)
  - 10 May
    - Spellbound
  - 22 May
    - Blood and Sand
  - 23 May
    - A Woman's Face
  - 24 May
    - Crook's Tour
  - 30 May
    - In the Navy
- June 1941
  - 7 June
    - Shining Victory
  - 11 June
    - The Gang's All Here
  - 13 June
    - Broadway Limited
    - Man Hunt
    - One Night in Lisbon
  - 18 June
    - Moon Over Miami
  - 20 June
    - The Big Store
    - The Reluctant Dragon
  - 25 June
    - Caught in the Draft
  - 26 June
    - Blossoms in the Dust
  - 27 June
    - Hit the Road
  - 28 June
    - Kipps
    - Love on the Dole (GB)

=== July–September ===
- July 1941
  - 2 July
    - Sergeant York
    - The Sea Wolf
  - 4 July
    - A Charming Man (Czechoslovakia)
  - 12 July
    - The Bride Came C.O.D.
  - 18 July
    - The Shepherd of the Hills
  - 25 July
    - Target for Tonight (GB)
  - 26 July
    - Bad Men of Missouri
    - Pimpernel Smith
- August 1941
  - 1 August
    - Bowery Blitzkrieg
    - Charley's Aunt
  - 2 August
    - Major Barbara (GB)
  - 6 August
    - Hold That Ghost
  - 7 August
    - Here Comes Mr. Jordan
  - 8 August
    - Six Gun Gold
  - 9 August
    - Manpower
  - 12 August
    - Dr. Jekyll and Mr. Hyde
  - 15 August
    - Life Begins for Andy Hardy
  - 21 August
    - Sun Valley Serenade
  - 28 August
    - The Blue Star Hotel (Czechoslovakia)
  - 29 August
    - The Little Foxes
- September
  - 1 September
    - Lady Be Good
  - 5 September
    - Charlie Chan in Rio
  - 6 September
    - Cottage to Let (GB)
  - 18 September
    - Ladies in Retirement
  - 19 September
    - The Tyrant Father (Portugal)
  - 25 September
    - A Yank in the RAF
    - You'll Never Get Rich
  - 26 September
    - Hold Back the Dawn
    - It Started with Eve

=== October–December ===
- October 1941
  - 2 October
    - Honky Tonk
    - One Foot in Heaven
  - 8 October
    - 49th Parallel
    - Week-End in Havana
  - 10 October
    - Never Give a Sucker an Even Break
  - 17 October
    - The Devil and Daniel Webster
    - Jesse James at Bay
  - 18 October
    - The Maltese Falcon
  - 22 October
    - You Belong to Me
  - 23 October
    - Dumbo
  - 24 October
    - Spooks Run Wild
  - 25 October
    - The Tell-Tale Heart
  - 28 October
    - How Green Was My Valley
  - 31 October
    - The Chocolate Soldier
- November 1941
  - 7 November
    - Unexpected Uncle
  - 14 November
    - I Wake Up Screaming
    - Suspicion
  - 15 November
    - Blues in the Night
  - 21 November
    - Look Who's Laughing
    - Shadow of the Thin Man
    - Skylark
    - They Died with Their Boots On
  - 27 November
    - Stormy Waters (France)
  - 28 November
    - The Corsican Brothers
    - Keep 'Em Flying
- December 1941
  - 1 December
    - The 47 Ronin (Part 1) (Japan)
    - Tarzan's Secret Treasure
  - 2 December
    - Ball of Fire
  - 5 December
    - Mr. Bug Goes to Town
  - 12 December
    - Among the Living
    - Red River Valley
    - The Wolf Man
  - 18 December
    - H.M. Pulham, Esq.
    - Kathleen
  - 21 December
    - The Heavenly Play (Sweden)
  - 25 December
    - Louisiana Purchase
    - The Shanghai Gesture
  - 26 December
    - Hellzapoppin'
    - The Sausage-Maker Who Disappeared (Norway)

== Serials ==
- The Adventures of Captain Marvel, starring Tom Tyler, directed by William Witney and John English
- Dick Tracy vs Crime Inc, starring Ralph Byrd, directed by William Witney and John English
- The Green Hornet, starring Gordon Jones
- Holt of the Secret Service, directed by James W. Horne
- The Iron Claw, directed by James W. Horne
- Jungle Girl, starring Frances Gifford, directed by William Witney and John English
- King of the Texas Rangers, directed by William Witney and John English
- Riders of Death Valley, directed by Ray Taylor and Ford Beebe
- Sea Raiders, directed by Ray Taylor and Ford Beebe
- Sky Raiders, directed by Ray Taylor and Ford Beebe
- The Spider Returns, starring Warren Hull, directed by James W. Horne
- White Eagle, directed by James W. Horne

== Comedy film series ==
- Buster Keaton (1917–1944)
- Laurel and Hardy (1921–1945)
- Our Gang (1922–1944)
- Marx Brothers (1929–1946)
- The Three Stooges (1933–1962)

== Animated short film series ==
- Mickey Mouse (1928–1942, 1947–1953)
- Looney Tunes (1930–1969)
  - Bugs Bunny (1940–1964)
  - Daffy Duck (1937–1968)
  - Porky Pig (1935–1946, 1948–1951)
  - Sniffles (1939–1946)
  - Inki (1939–1950)
- Terrytoons (1930–1964)
- Merrie Melodies (1931–1969)
- Scrappy (1931-1941)
- Popeye (1933–1957)
- Color Rhapsodies (1934–1949)
- Donald Duck (1937–1956)
- Walter Lantz Cartunes (also known as New Universal Cartoons or Cartune Comedies) (1938–1942)
- Goofy (1939–1955)
- Andy Panda (1939–1949)
- Tom and Jerry (1940–1958, 1961–1967)
  - The Midnight Snack
  - The Night Before Christmas
- Woody Woodpecker (1941–1949, 1951–1972)
- Swing Symphonies (1941–1945)
- The Fox and the Crow (1941–1950)
- Superman (1941–1943)

== Births ==
- January 1
  - Simón Andreu, Spanish actor
  - Eva Ras, Serbian actress, writer and painter
- January 3 - Derrick O'Connor, Irish actor (died 2018)
- January 4
  - George P. Cosmatos, Greek-Italian director and screenwriter (died 2005)
  - John Bennett Perry, American actor
- January 7 - Harvey Evans, American actor (died 2021)
- January 8 - Graham Chapman, British actor (died 1989)
- January 10 – José Greci, Italian actress (died 2017)
- January 12 - Long John Baldry, English-Canadian singer, musician and voice actor (died 2005)
- January 14
  - Faye Dunaway, American actress
  - Jack Thibeau, American former actor
- January 15 - Geoffrey Beevers, British actor
- January 19 - Putter Smith, American jazz bassist and actor
- January 20
  - Marylouise Burke, American actress
  - Henry Cele, South African actor (died 2007)
- January 24 - Neil Diamond, American actor and singer
- January 27 - Jeannie Epper, American stuntwoman and actress (died 2024)
- January 31 – Jessica Walter, American actress (died 2021)
- February 5 - David Selby, American actor
- February 8 – Nick Nolte, American actor and producer
- February 10 – Michael Apted, English director, producer and screenwriter (died 2021)
- February 11 - Sonny Landham, American actor and stunt performer (died 2017)
- February 13 - Bo Svenson, Swedish-American actor, director, screenwriter and producer
- February 27 - Charlotte Stewart, American actress
- March 3 - Rada Rassimov, Italian actress
- March 4
  - John Aprea, American actor and comedian (died 2024)
  - Adrian Lyne, English director and producer
- March 6 - George P. Wilbur, American actor and professional stuntman (died 2023)
- March 14 – Wolfgang Petersen, German director, producer and screenwriter (died 2022)
- March 16
  - Bernardo Bertolucci, Italian director (died 2018)
  - Jerry Chipman, American actor (died 2020)
- March 18 - Frank McRae, American actor (died 2021)
- March 20 - Paul Junger Witt, American producer (died 2018)
- March 22 - Bruno Ganz, Swiss actor (died 2019)
- March 24 - David Fox, Canadian actor (died 2021)
- April 3 - Eric Braeden, German actor
- April 4 - Angelica Domröse, German actress (died 2026)
- April 7
  - Cornelia Frances, English-Australian actress (died 2018)
  - Danny Wells, Canadian actor and comedian (died 2013)
- April 9 - Hannah Gordon, Scottish actress and presenter
- April 12 - Manuel de Blas, Spanish actor
- April 13 - Michael Alldredge, American actor (died 1997)
- April 20
  - David Leland, English director (died 2023)
  - Ryan O'Neal, American actor (died 2023)
- April 26 - Claudine Auger, French actress (died 2019)
- April 28 – Ann-Margret, Swedish-born American actress, dancer and singer
- May 2 - Paul Darrow, English actor (died 2019)
- May 13 – Senta Berger, Austrian actress and producer
- May 17 - Grace Zabriskie, American actress
- May 18 - Miriam Margolyes, British-Australian character actress
- May 19
  - Nora Ephron, American writer and filmmaker (died 2012)
  - Tania Mallet, English actress and model (died 2019)
- May 24 – Andrés García, Dominican-Mexican actor
- May 29
  - Nick McLean, American cinematographer and actor
  - Bill Weston, British stunt performer and actor (died 2012)
- June 2
  - Stacy Keach, American actor ,(died 2026)
  - Mahmoud Yassine, Egyptian actor (died 2020)
- June 5 – Spalding Gray, American actor and screenwriter (died 2004)
- June 8 - Jessie Lawrence Ferguson, American actor (died 2019)
- June 10
  - Mickey Jones, American musician and actor (died 2018)
  - Jürgen Prochnow, German actor
- June 17 - Roberta Maxwell, Canadian actress
- June 20
  - Stephen Frears, English film director
  - Dieter Mann, German actor (died 2022)
- June 21
  - Joe Flaherty, Canadian-American actor and comedian (died 2024)
  - Lyman Ward, Canadian actor
- June 22 – Michael Lerner, American actor (died 2023)
- June 25 – Denys Arcand, Canadian director and screenwriter
- June 27 – Krzysztof Kieślowski, Polish director (died 1996)
- July 1 - Milos Milos, Serbian-born American actor and stunt double (died 1966)
- July 9 - Yosef Shiloach, Israeli actor (died 2011)
- July 10 - Robert Pine, American actor
- July 13 - Robert Forster, American actor (died 2019)
- July 17 - Paula Shaw, American actress (died 2025)
- July 18 - Starletta DuPois, American actress
- July 21 - Edward Herrmann, American actor, director and writer (died 2014)
- July 26 - Darlene Love, American actress and singer
- July 28
  - Peter Cullen, Canadian voice actor (died 2026)
  - Colin Higgins, Australian-American screenwriter, actor, director and producer (died 1988)
- July 29 – David Warner, English actor (died 2022)
- August 4
  - Martin Jarvis, English actor
  - Paul Mooney, American comedian, writer and actor (died 2021)
- August 7 - Franco Columbu, Italian bodybuilder, actor and producer (died 2019)
- August 8 - Earl Boen, American actor (died 2023)
- August 12
  - Dana Ivey, American actress
  - Deborah Walley, American actress (died 2001)
- August 15 - Lou Perryman, American character actor (died 2009)
- August 26
  - Joan Freeman, American retired actress
  - Barbet Schroeder, Iranian-born Swiss director, producer and actor
- August 28 - Tony Barry, Australian actor (died 2022)
- August 29
  - Ellen Geer, American actress
  - Mark Kasdan, American screenwriter and producer
  - Orestes Matacena, Cuban-American actor, director, producer and writer
- September 4 - Rochelle Kaffenberger, American actress (died 2024)
- September 18 - Gerry Bamman, American actor
- September 26 – Martine Beswick, English actress and model
- October 5 - Stephanie Cole, British actress (died 2026)
- October 6
  - Billy Murray, English actor
  - Winston Ntshona, South African actor (died 2018)
- October 9 - Michael Goodwin, American character actor
- October 10 – Peter Coyote, American actor
- October 11 - Charles Shyer, American director, screenwriter and producer (died 2024)
- October 19 – Simon Ward, English actor (died 2012)
- October 20 – Clare Peploe, English-Italian screenwriter and director (died 2021)
- October 23 – Mel Winkler, American actor (died 2020)
- October 24 – Frank Aendenboom, Belgian actor (died 2018)
- October 25 – Gordon Tootoosis, Aboriginal Canadian actor (died 2011)
- October 31
  - Mischa Hausserman, Austrian-born American actor (died 2021)
  - Sally Kirkland, American actress (died 2025)
- November 1
  - Robert Foxworth, American actor
  - Archie Hahn, American character actor
- November 18 – David Hemmings, English actor, director and producer (died 2003)
- November 21 – Nessa Hyams, American casting director (died 2026)
- November 22 – Tom Conti, Scottish actor
- November 23 – Franco Nero, Italian actor
- November 25 – Tiit Lilleorg, Estonian actor (died 2021)
- November 27 - Tom Morga, American stuntman, stunt coordinator and actor
- November 30 - Sally Douglas, British actress (died 2001)
- December 4 – Leila Säälik, Estonian actress
- December 6
  - Evald Hermaküla, Estonian actor and director (died 2000)
  - Leon Russom, American actor
- December 8 – Valora Noland, American actress (died 2022)
- December 9 – Beau Bridges, American actor
- December 10
  - Fionnula Flanagan, Irish actress
  - Peter Michael Goetz, American actor
- December 11 - John Davidson, American actor, singer and game show host
- December 15 - Vladan Živković, Serbian actor (died 2022)
- December 25 - John Capodice, American character actor (died 2024)
- December 27 - Aharon Ipalé, Israeli-American actor (died 2016)

== Deaths ==
- January 4 – Henri Bergson, 81, French writer
- January 10 – Joe Penner, 36, American comedian, actor, The Boys from Syracuse, Millionaire Playboy, The Day the Bookies Wept, Mr. Doodle Kicks Off, heart attack
- March 13 – Stuart Walker, 63, American director, White Woman, Great Expectations
- April 23 – Stanley Fields, 57, American actor, The Great Plane Robbery, The Lady from Cheyenne
- May 8 – Tore Svennberg, 83, Swedish actor, The Phantom Carriage, A Woman's Face
- May 10 – S. J. Warmington, 56, English actor, The Man Who Knew Too Much, killed by enemy action
- May 12 – Ruth Stonehouse, 48, American actress, film director, The Satin Woman
- May 22 – Ida Waterman, 89, American actress, Stella Maris, The Enchanted Cottage, Amarilly of Clothes-Line Alley, Esmerelda
- June 28 – Richard Carle, 69, American actor, The Little Red Schoolhouse, Love Before Breakfast, Rhythm in the Clouds, She Asked for It
- July 25 – Purnell Pratt, 55, American actor, Alibi, Scarface, The Mystery Squadron, Dancing Feet
- July 29 – James Stephenson, 52, English actor, The Letter, Shining Victory
- August 13 – J. Stuart Blackton, 66, British-American film producer and director, co-founder of Vitagraph Studios, The Glorious Adventure
- September 18 – Claude King, 66, English actor, Behind the Mask, It Couldn't Have Happened – But It Did
- October 9 – Helen Morgan, 41, American actress and singer, You Belong to Me, Applause, Show Boat
- October 26 – Victor Schertzinger, 53, American director, Paramount on Parade, Road to Zanzibar
- November 2 – Bengt Djurberg, 43, Swedish actor, Troll-elgen
- December 21 – David Howard, 45, American film director, Daniel Boone

== Film debuts ==
- Reginald Beckwith – Freedom Radio
- Adriana Benetti – Teresa Venerdì
- Marina Berti – La fuggitiva
- Barbara Britton – Secrets of the Wasteland
- Faith Brook – Suspicion
- Leslie Brooks – Ziegfeld Girl
- James Brown – Ride, Kelly, Ride
- Phil Brown – I Wanted Wings
- Janis Carter – Cadet Girl
- John Cason – Buck Privates
- Cyd Charisse – Escort Girl
- Françoise Christophe – Premier rendez-vous
- David Clarke – Knockout
- George Cole – Cottage to Let
- Ray Collins – Citizen Kane
- Joseph Cotten – Citizen Kane
- Yvonne De Carlo – Harvard, Here I Come
- Dino De Laurentiis (producer) – L'amore canta
- John Dehner – The Reluctant Dragon
- Richard Derr – Charlie Chan in Rio
- Anita Durante – Scampolo
- Faye Emerson – Affectionately Yours
- Bill Erwin – You're in the Army Now
- Renée Faure – Who Killed Santa Claus?
- Suzanne Flon – Ce n'est pas moi
- Elisabeth Fraser – One Foot in Heaven
- Terry Frost – Cyclone on Horseback
- Eva Gabor – Forced Landing
- Ava Gardner – Shadow of the Thin Man
- Karen X. Gaylord – The Chocolate Soldier
- Jackie Gleason – Navy Blues
- Kenneth Griffith – The Farmer's Wife
- Eloise Hardt – You Belong to Me
- Richard Haydn – Charley's Aunt
- Sterling Hayden – Virginia
- Jayne Hazard – The Monster and the Girl
- Charlton Heston – Peer Gynt
- Jennifer Holt – Stick to Your Guns
- Bruce Lee – Golden Gate Girl
- Anna Maestri – Teresa Venerdì
- Patrick McVey – Caught in the Draft
- Sid Melton – New York Town
- Agnes Moorehead – Citizen Kane
- Margaret O'Brien – Babes on Broadway
- Larry Parks – Mystery Ship
- Annette Poivre – Premier rendez-vous
- Vera Ralston – Ice-Capades
- Carl Benton Reid – The Little Foxes
- Adeline De Walt Reynolds – Come Live with Me
- Amparo Rivelles – Mari Juana
- Natalie Schafer – The Body Disappears
- Frank Sinatra – Las Vegas Nights
- Everett Sloane – Citizen Kane
- Woody Strode – Sundown
- Simone Valère – Premier rendez-vous
- Tito Vuolo – Shadow of the Thin Man
- Janet Warren – Buck Privates
- Ruth Warrick – Citizen Kane
- Orson Welles – Citizen Kane
- Rhys Williams – How Green Was My Valley
- Marie Windsor – Unexpected Uncle
- Barbara Woodell – Mr. & Mrs. Smith
- Teresa Wright – The Little Foxes
