= List of British films of 1941 =

A list of British films released in 1941.

Title	Director	Cast	Genre	Notes
49th Parallel	Michael Powell	Eric Portman, Laurence Olivier, Leslie Howard	World War II	
An Airman's Letter to His Mother	Michael Powell	John Gielgud	Documentary	
Atlantic Ferry	Walter Forde	Michael Redgrave, Valerie Hobson, Griffith Jones	Drama	
The Common Touch	John Baxter	Geoffrey Hibbert, Greta Gynt, Joyce Howard	Drama	
Cottage to Let	Anthony Asquith	Leslie Banks, Alastair Sim, John Mills	Thriller	
Dangerous Moonlight	Brian Desmond Hurst	Anton Walbrook, Sally Gray, Derrick De Marney	Drama	
Danny Boy	Oswald Mitchell	David Farrar, Wilfrid Lawson, Ann Todd	Drama	
East of Piccadilly	Harold Huth	Judy Campbell, Sebastian Shaw	Mystery	
Facing the Music	Maclean Rogers	Bunny Doyle, Betty Driver	Comedy	
The Farmer's Wife	Norman Lee, Leslie Arliss	Basil Sydney, Wilfrid Lawson	Drama	
Fingers	Herbert Mason	Clifford Evans, Leonora Corbett	Drama	
Freedom Radio	Anthony Asquith	Clive Brook, Diana Wynyard	Drama	
Gasbags	Walter Forde, Marcel Varnel	Bud Flanagan, Chesney Allen	Comedy	
The Ghost of St. Michael's	Marcel Varnel	Will Hay, Claude Hulbert	Comedy/thriller	
The Ghost Train	Walter Forde	Arthur Askey, Kathleen Harrison	Comedy	
He Found a Star	John Paddy Carstairs	Vic Oliver, Sarah Churchill	Musical	
Hi Gang!	Marcel Varnel	Bebe Daniels, Ben Lyon	Comedy	
I Thank You	Marcel Varnel	Arthur Askey, Richard Murdoch	Comedy	
Inspector Hornleigh Goes To It	Walter Forde	Gordon Harker, Alastair Sim, Phyllis Calvert	Comedy/crime	
Jeannie	Harold French	Barbara Mullen, Michael Redgrave	Comedy	
Kipps	Carol Reed	Michael Redgrave, Diana Wynyard	Comedy	
Love on the Dole	John Baxter	Deborah Kerr, Clifford Evans	Drama	
Major Barbara	Gabriel Pascal	Wendy Hiller, Rex Harrison	Drama	Adaptation of the George Bernard Shaw play
The Man at the Gate	Norman Walker	Wilfrid Lawson, Kathleen O'Regan	Drama	
My Wife's Family	Walter C. Mycroft	Charles Clapham, John Warwick, Patricia Roc	Comedy	
Old Bill and Son	Ian Dalrymple	Morland Graham, John Mills	Comedy	
Old Mother Riley in Business	John Baxter	Arthur Lucan, Kitty McShane	Comedy	
Old Mother Riley's Circus	Thomas Bentley	Arthur Lucan, Kitty McShane	Comedy	
Old Mother Riley's Ghosts	John Baxter	Arthur Lucan, Kitty McShane	Comedy	
Once a Crook	Herbert Mason	Gordon Harker, Sydney Howard	Crime	
Penn of Pennsylvania	Lance Comfort	Deborah Kerr, Clifford Evans	Historical/drama	
"Pimpernel" Smith	Leslie Howard	Leslie Howard, Mary Morris	Thriller	
The Prime Minister	Thorold Dickinson	John Gielgud, Diana Wynyard	Biopic	
Quiet Wedding	Anthony Asquith	Margaret Lockwood, Derek Farr	Comedy	
The Saint Meets the Tiger	Paul L. Stein	Hugh Sinclair, Jean Gillie, Clifford Evans	Mystery	
The Saint's Vacation	Leslie Fenton	Hugh Sinclair, Sally Gray	Mystery	
The Seventh Survivor	Leslie S. Hiscott	Felix Aylmer, Jane Carr	Thriller	
Sheepdog of the Hills	Germain Burger	David Farrar, Philip Friend	Drama	
Ships with Wings	Sergei Nolbandov	John Clements, Leslie Banks	War	
South American George	Marcel Varnel	George Formby, Linden Travers	Comedy	
Spellbound	John Harlow	Derek Farr, Vera Lindsay	Drama	
Spring Meeting	Walter C. Mycroft	Enid Stamp-Taylor, Michael Wilding	Comedy	
Target for Tonight	Harry Watt	Royal Air Force personnel	World War II documentary	
That Hamilton Woman	Alexander Korda	Laurence Olivier, Vivien Leigh	Historical drama	
This England	David MacDonald	John Clements, Constance Cummings	Historical	
This Man Is Dangerous	Lawrence Huntington	James Mason, Gordon McLeod, Margaret Vyner	Thriller	Alternative title: The Patient Vanishes
Tower of Terror	Lawrence Huntington	Wilfrid Lawson, Michael Rennie	Thriller	
Turned Out Nice Again	Marcel Varnel	George Formby, Peggy Bryan	Comedy	
You Will Remember	Jack Raymond	Robert Morley, Emlyn Williams	Musical	

== See also ==
- 1941 in British music
- 1941 in British television
- 1941 in the United Kingdom
