= Stephen Barry =

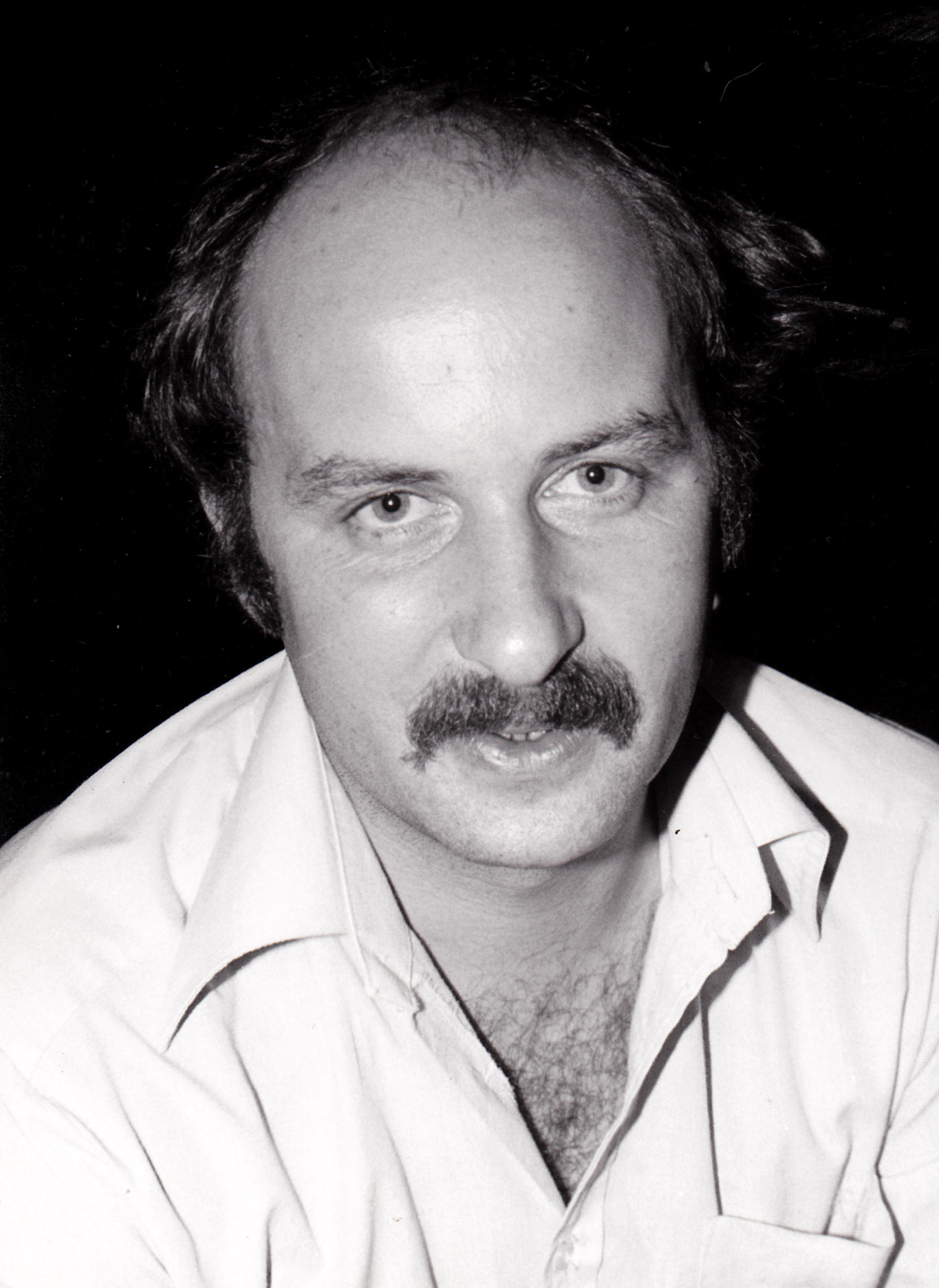
Stephen Barry

Stephen Leon Reid Barry (4 July 1945 – 18 October 2000) was a British arts administrator, drama producer, and artistic director. He was chief executive of two Edinburgh theatres, the Festival and the King's, prime venues of the famed Edinburgh International Festival. In his short career, he also supervised artistic live-theatre rejuvenations at The Playhouse Theatre (Perth), Australia, the Lyceum Theatre (Sheffield) and the Theatre Royal, Bath.

== Early life ==
Barry was born in Welwyn Garden City. His father, Gerald, was editor of the News Chronicle, and his first contact with the theatre was through his mother, the actress Vera Lindsay. He was educated at Marlborough College and Manchester University, where he studied drama under Hugh Hunt and Stephen Joseph. In 1973, he married Jacqueline Lindsay with whom he had one son and one daughter.

== Professional career ==
Stephen Barry trained as a director with Bernard Miles at the Mermaid Theatre, served as assistant director at the Yvonne Arnaud Theatre, Guildford, and was a staff director at the National Theatre under Laurence Olivier at the Old Vic.

In 1974, aged 29, he took up his first artistic directorship for a theatre in Harrogate. Four years later, he accepted the challenge of rejuvenating The National Theatre at the Playhouse in Perth, Western Australia. In that role he created many very successful presentations including Alan Ayckbourn's The Norman Conquests, a season of Death of a Salesman with Warren Mitchell, and sellout performances of Pam Gems's musical Piaf with Judy Davis. He also commissioned and produced a controversial Dorothy Hewett play, The Man from Mukinupin for Western Australia's 150th anniversary (WAY '79).

In 1982, he returned to the UK to serve as artistic director with the Redgrave Theatre in Farnham until 1986, and then the Theatre Royal, Bath. According to The Guardian obituarist Paul Allen, "His role as an artistic director and administrator in leading regional theatres heralded a new era for subsidised drama in Britain."
