= Mirabel Osler =

English writer and garden designer

- Born: Mirabel E E Birnstingl; 1925; London
- Died: 20 October 2016 (aged 90–91); Hereford
- Occupation: Writer
- Spouse: Michael John Osler
- Children: 1 son & 2 daughters
- Relatives: Aylmer Vallance (Stepfather)
- Writing career
- Language: English
- Subject: Gardening
- Notable awards: Sinclair Consumer Press Garden Writer of the Year 1988 Garden Writers Guild Journalist of the Year 2003

Mirabel Osler (1925 - 20 October, 2016) was an English writer and garden designer. Her memoir A Gentle Plea for Chaos (1989), based on her experiences in her garden in Shropshire, was said to send "a blast of fresh air through the stuffy rooms of the English gardening world when it was first published."

== Biography ==
Mirabel was born Mirabel E E Birnstingl in 1925 in London. She was the daughter of Harry Joseph Birnstingl and Phyllis Taylor Reid. Her stepfather was the author and journalist Aylmer Vallance. She married Michael Julian Osler on 5 April 1951 and they lived in Thailand and Corfu before returning to England to live in Shropshire. Michael died on 26 April 1989. They had one son and two daughters (the youngest, Sureen, was adopted).

She wrote regularly for the garden magazine Hortus.

She died in Hereford County Hospital on 20 October 2016 aged 91.

== Awards ==
- Mirabel won the Sinclair Consumer Press Garden Writer of the Year Award in 1988.
- Mirabel won the Journalist of the Year Award from the Garden Writers Guild in 2003

== Bibliography ==
- Osler, M.; A Gentle Plea for Chaos: the Enchantment of Gardening 1989, New York City: Simon & Schuster ISBN 1-55970-439-X
- —, The Garden Bench 1991, New York City: Simon & Schuster ISBN 0-671-74403-8
- —, In the Eye of the Garden 1993, London: Weidenfeld & Nicolson ISBN 978-0-460-86141-0
- —, The Garden Wall 1993, New York City: Simon & Schuster
- —, A spoon with every course: in search of the legendary food of France 1996, London: Pavilion ISBN 978-1-85793-766-4
- —, A Breath From Elsewhere: Musings on Gardens 1998, London: Bloomsbury ISBN 978-0-7475-3518-8
- —, The Elusive Truffle: Travels in Search of the Legendary Food of France 2000, London: Black Swan ISBN 978-0-552-99852-9
- —, The Rain Tree: A Memoir 2011, London: Bloomsbury ISBN 978-1-4088-1548-9
