= Athletic News Cricket Annual =

The 1930 edition

The Athletic News Cricket Annual was one of several sporting annuals published initially by the Athletic News, a Manchester-based weekly newspaper devoted almost entirely to reporting sports events. It was first issued in 1888 and it had reached its 48th edition by 1939 (after omitting the First World War years). By that time it was generally including over 200 pages together with a small number of photographs. As well as containing test match and county championship records, this particular cricket annual differed from a number of similar publications by the depth of its coverage of certain minor leagues — especially those in the north of England (close to its home base) and also in Scotland.

After World War II it reappeared as the Athletic News Cricket and Golf Annual (1946), then subsequently – from its 50th year – as the Sunday Chronicle Cricket and Golf Annual (1947–1954), before one last year as the Sunday Chronicle Cricket Annual (1955). Like its companion volume the Athletic News Football Annual it was for many years edited by ‘Tityrus’ (J A H Catton) and afterwards by Ivan Sharpe.

== Details ==
Editions produced since 1935:-

Year	Edition	Title	Editor	Price	Pages
1935	44th	Athletic News Cricket Annual	Ivan Sharpe	6d	192
1936	45th	Athletic News Cricket Annual	Ivan Sharpe	6d	192
1937	46th	Athletic News Cricket Annual	Ivan Sharpe	6d	
1938	47th	Athletic News Cricket Annual	Ivan Sharpe	6d	
1939	48th	Athletic News Cricket Annual	Ivan Sharpe	6d	
1946	49th	Athletic News Cricket & Golf Annual	Ivan Sharpe	1s	
1947	50th	Sunday Chronicle Cricket & Golf Annual	Ivan Sharpe	1s	192
1948	51st	Sunday Chronicle Cricket & Golf Annual	Ivan Sharpe	1s 6d	
1949	52nd	Sunday Chronicle Cricket & Golf Annual	Ivan Sharpe	1s 6d	
1950	53rd	Sunday Chronicle Cricket & Golf Annual	Ivan Sharpe	1s 6d	224
1951	54th	Sunday Chronicle Cricket & Golf Annual	Ivan Sharpe	1s 6d	
1952	55th	Sunday Chronicle Cricket & Golf Annual	Ivan Sharpe	1s 6d	224
1953	56th	Sunday Chronicle Cricket & Golf Annual	Ivan Sharpe	1s 6d	
1954	57th	Sunday Chronicle Cricket & Golf Annual	Ivan Sharpe	1s 6d	
1955	58th	Sunday Chronicle Cricket Annual	Ivan Sharpe	1s 6d	208

Note: The 1947-1955 editions were sub-titled 'incorporating the Athletic News Cricket Annual'.
