= Get Ahead =

British BBC Television series (1958–1962)

Get Ahead is a BBC Television programme that ran from 1958 to 1962 and offered a prize of £5,000 (equivalent to £102,000 in 2025) to a contestant's idea for an entrepreneurial project for a profitable business. It was an early forerunner of programmes such as Dragons' Den on BBC Two.

The programme was sponsored by the News Chronicle as a form of indirect advertising to skirt the Television Act 1954. After the News Chronicle was taken over by the Daily Mail, the Mail became the programme's sponsor.

The programme was presented by Kenneth Horne and Peter West. A panel of senior business experts judged the merit of the award and included Sir Miles Thomas, who had been chairman of BOAC and the British offshoot of Monsanto, the American chemical company at the time.
