= Ivan Sharpe =

English footballer

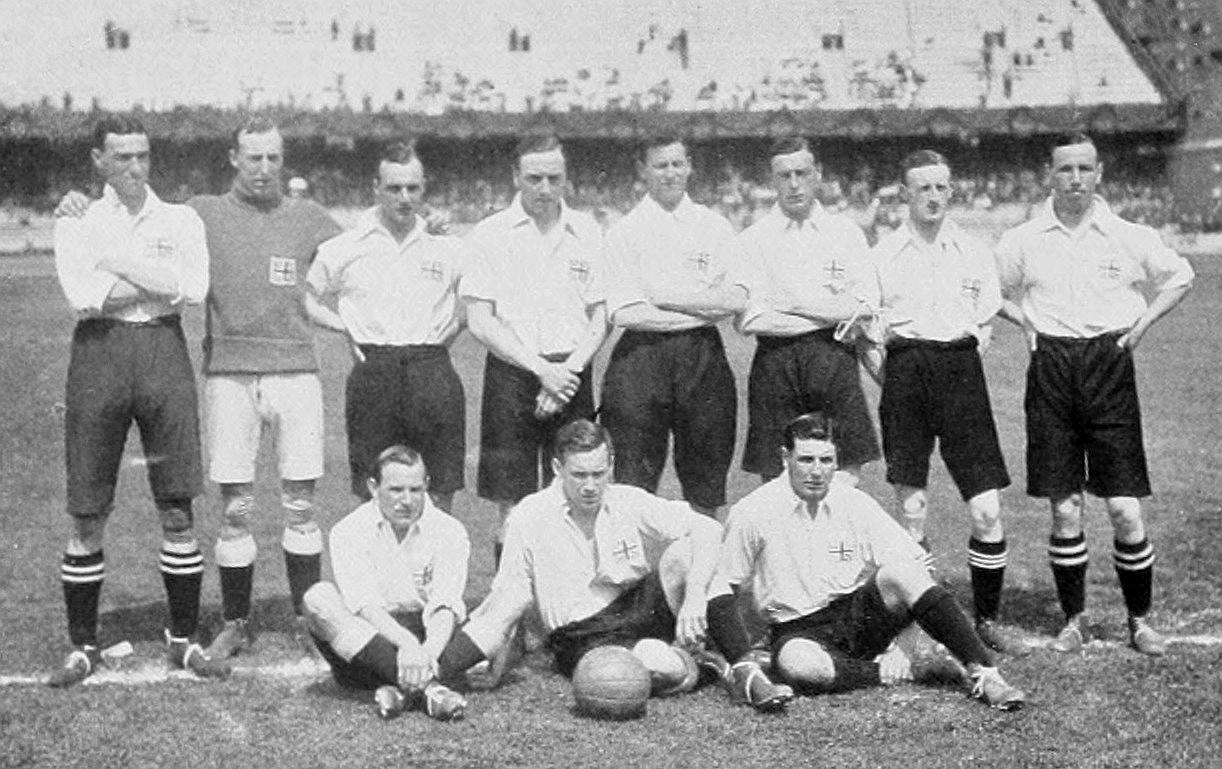
- Sharpe was part of Great Britain's 1912 Olympic gold medal winning football team.

Personal information
- Full name: Ivan Gordon Sharpe
- Date of birth: 15 June 1889
- Place of birth: St Albans, Hertfordshire, England
- Date of death: 9 February 1968 (aged 78)
- Place of death: Southport, Lancashire, England
- Height: 5 ft 8 in (1.73 m)
- Position: Left winger

Youth career
- –1907: St Albans

Senior career*
Years	Team	Apps	(Gls)
1907–1908	Watford	7	(1)
1908–1911	Glossop North End		
1911–1913	Derby County	57	(12)
1913–1919	Leeds City	65	(17)
1920	Leeds United	1	(0)

International career
1911–1914	England amateur		(4)
Medal record
Men's football
Representing Great Britain
Olympic Games
Gold medal – first place	1912 Stockholm	Team competition
- * Club domestic league appearances and goals

Ivan Gordon Sharpe (15 June 1889 – 9 February 1968) was an English amateur footballer. Although an amateur, he played for several professional clubs, including Watford, Derby County— with whom he won the Football League First Division in 1911–12–and later Leeds United. He represented the England national amateur football team, and also the Great Britain Olympic football team, with whom he won an Olympic gold medal at the 1912 games in Sweden. He is also one of very few players to have played for both Leeds City (65 appearances and 17 goals) and Leeds United (1 appearance 0 goals).

After retirement he enjoyed a long career as a sports journalist, becoming president of the Football Writers Association. He served as editor of the Athletic News Football Annual and also of the Athletic News Cricket Annual. In 1936 he was selected by the BBC to be one of two journalists (the other being Norman Creek) who for the first time provided live commentary on the FA Cup Final. He continued to contribute a hard-hitting article to the Wolverhampton Wanderers match day programme for many years right up to his death. He produced a volume of memoirs "40 Years in Football" in 1954, as well as writing "Soccer Top Ten" in 1962, detailing his ten favourite players.

== International goals ==
England Amateurs score listed first, score column indicates score after each Sharpe goal.

List of international goals scored by Ivan Sharpe
No.	Date	Venue	Opponent	Score	Result	Competition	Ref
1	25 May 1911	Spitalacker, Bern, Switzerland	Switzerland	1–0	4–1	Friendly	
2	24 February 1914	Stade du Vivier d'Oie, Bruxelles, Belgium	Belgium	?	8–1	Friendly	
3	24 February 1914	Stade du Vivier d'Oie, Bruxelles, Belgium	Belgium	?	8–1	Friendly	
4	10 June 1914	Råsunda IP, Solna, Sweden	Sweden	2-0	5–1	Friendly	
