= Peter West =

British television presenter (1920–2003)

- West c. 1962
- Born: 12 August 1920; Croydon, Surrey, England
- Died: 2 September 2003 (aged 83); Bath, Somerset, England
- Education: Cranbrook School, Kent
- Occupations: Commentator; presenter
- Years active: 1947–1986
- Spouse: Pauline Pike (m. 1946)
- Children: 2

Peter Anthony West (12 August 1920 – 2 September 2003) was a British presenter and sports commentator and writer best known for his work on the BBC's cricket, tennis and rugby coverage as well as occasionally commentating on hockey. Throughout his television career he remained freelance.

== Background ==
West was born in Croydon, Surrey, and grew up in Cranbrook, Kent, an only child. His father, the son of a tobacconist, had made some money in the City of London after the First World War. In 1924, he set himself up as a poultry farmer in Cranbrook, but lost much of his fortune in the European banking crisis of 1931.

He was educated at Cranbrook School, as were his fellow commentators Barry Davies and Brian Moore. At school, he was in the cricket XI for five years, and captain for the last three. He played rugby and hockey for the school for four years, captaining both games for his last two seasons, and, in rugby, leading an undefeated side. He ended his Cranbrook career as head of the school.

After school, he went to the Royal Military Academy Sandhurst and was commissioned into the Duke of Wellington's (West Riding) Regiment, 33rd of Foot, which had the reputation of being the best rugby regiment in the Army. At Sandhurst he became an instructor but, after being diagnosed with spondylitis, was invalided out of the Army in 1944.

== Career ==
Facing a post war world with no qualifications, West secured a job as assistant to the Controller of SSAFA, a retired Air Vice-Marshal but was fired; he later commented "I deserved it, but I got them back: I stole their secretary Pauline. I married her." By 1947, he was stuck in a dead-end job transmitting sports results via telegraph ticker tape. However, one day, when sitting next to the test cricketer and journalist C. B. Fry in the press box at Taunton, he was able to transmit Fry’s report after the telephonist failed to turn up. Fry recommended West to the head of the BBC outside broadcasting and West was signed up as a cricket commentator. He remained a cricket commentator, both on radio and television, until 1986. In addition, from 1955 to 1982, he worked alongside Dan Maskell in the BBC's television coverage of Wimbledon. The Daily Telegraph said that he had covered more than 30 sports over the course of his career.

He reported the Olympics from 1948 to 1972, missing only 1952 and 1956.

West was the editor of Playfair Cricket Annual from its inception in 1948 until 1954. He joined the BBC in 1947 on the recommendation of C.B. Fry, following a chance meeting. He worked for the BBC for nearly 40 years until retiring in 1986.

In 1956, West interviewed Walter Hurst, a surviving fireman from the steamship Titanic, which sank in April 1912 in the North Atlantic during her maiden voyage. In the program on BBC Television, Hurst described his ordeal and how he survived aboard upturned Collapsible Boat B.

He presented many BBC programmes not connected with sport, including the original version of Come Dancing (1957–72), What's My Line?, and Get Ahead (1958–62), about business entrepreneurs. He was a cricket and rugby correspondent for both The Times and The Daily Telegraph.

During interviews with sportsmen, West was in the habit of using words that were unfamiliar to his interlocutors. On one occasion, speaking to Viv Richards, he said "Viv, your genius transcends parochialism." In 1984, after Jimmy White had won the Masters, he asked White to comment upon the "wonderful ethos which had permeated the final". When White said he was glad he won, West continued to press him about the ethos. Eventually, Terry Griffiths, White's opponent, stepped in and rescued him. When interviewing Arthur Ashe after his famously deft victory over the belligerent Jimmy Connors in the Wimbledon final of 1975, he congratulated Ashe on "manifesting a superb tactical acumen". "If you say so Peter!" rejoined a bemused Ashe.

== Personal life ==
West married Pauline Pike in 1946, the woman he met in his first job: she was the one-time secretary to the irascible SSAFA Air Vice Marshal. They had a daughter, Jacqueline, and two sons, Simon and Stephen.

West died from prostate cancer at his home in Combe Down, in Bath, Somerset, on 2 September 2003, aged 83.

== See also ==
- Flannelled Fool and Muddied Oaf, autobiography, 1986.
