= 1941 in British music =

This is a summary of 1941 in music in the United Kingdom.

== Events ==
- 29 March – Benjamin Britten's Sinfonia da Requiem is premiered in Carnegie Hall by the New York Philharmonic Orchestra conducted by John Barbirolli.
- 3 April – William Walton's Scapino overture has its premiere in Chicago, conducted by Frederick Stock.
- May – Arthur Bliss joins the BBC's overseas music service.
- 10 May – London's Queen's Hall, venue for the Promenade Concerts, is bombed by the Luftwaffe. The Proms re-locate to the Royal Albert Hall.
- 30 October – On the occasion of Britten's String Quartet No. 1 being performed in Washington, he is awarded the Library of Congress Medal for services to chamber music.

== Popular music ==
- "Could You Please Oblige Us with a Bren Gun?" w.m. Noël Coward
- "Down Forget-Me-Not Lane" w.m. Horatio Nicholls, Charlie Chester & Reg Morgan
- "He Wears A Pair Of Silver Wings" w. Eric Maschwitz m. Michael Carr
- "Hey Little Hen" w.m. Ralph Butler & Noel Gay
- "London Pride" w.m. Noël Coward
- "When They Sound The Last All Clear" w.m. Hughie Charles, Louis Elton

== Classical music: new works ==
- Kenneth J. Alford
  - By Land and Sea
  - Army of the Nile
- Richard Addinsell – Warsaw Concerto
- Arthur Bliss – String Quartet No. 1
- Benjamin Britten – String Quartet No. 1
- Ralph Vaughan Williams – England, my England

== Opera ==
- Benjamin Britten – Paul Bunyan

== Film and Incidental music ==
- Richard Addinsell – Dangerous Moonlight
- William Walton – Major Barbara, starring Wendy Hiller and Rex Harrison.

== Musical films ==
- He Found a Star, starring Vic Oliver
- Turned Out Nice Again, starring George Formby
- You Will Remember, starring Robert Morley and Emlyn Williams

== Musical theatre ==
- 5 March – Apple Sauce revue opens at the Palladium.
- 24 July – Lady Behave London production opens at His Majesty's Theatre and runs for 401 performances.
- 19 November – Get a Load of This London production opens at the Hippodrome Theatre and runs for 698 performances.

== Births ==
- 12 January – Long John Baldry, R&B singer (died 2005)
- 4 February – John Steel, drummer (The Animals and Eggs over Easy)
- 14 February – Big Jim Sullivan, English guitarist (died 2012)
- 5 April – Dave Swarbrick, folk musician (died 2016)
- 11 April – Arthur Davies, operatic tenor (died 2018)
- 13 April – Margaret Price, soprano
- 23 April – Ed Stewart, disc jockey (died 2016)
- 3 May – Paul Ferris, film composer and actor (died 1995)
- 9 May – Pete Birrell, bass player (Freddie and the Dreamers)
- 11 May – Eric Burdon, R&B singer (The Animals)
- 21 May – Martin Carthy, folk musician
- 9 June – Jon Lord, keyboard player and composer (died 2012)
- 12 June – Reg Presley, singer and songwriter (died 2013)
- 30 June
  - Mike Leander, arranger, songwriter and record producer (died 1996)
  - Nigel Walley, tea-chest bass player and golfer
- 7 July – Jim Rodford, bass player (The Kinks, The Swinging Blue Jeans, The Zombies, The Kast Off Kinks and Argent)
- 17 July – Spencer Davis, instrumentalist (The Spencer Davis Group)
- 20 August – Anne Evans, operatic soprano
- 10 September – Christopher Hogwood, conductor and harpsichordist
- 27 October – Don Partridge, singer-songwriter (died 2010)
- 2 November – Brian Poole, singer (The Tremeloes)
- 15 November – Rick Kemp, singer-songwriter, bass player and producer (Steeleye Span)
- 24 November – Pete Best, rock drummer (The Beatles original lineup)
- 10 December – Peter Sarstedt, Indian-born British singer-songwriter (died 2017)
- 27 December
  - Les Maguire, pop pianist (Gerry & the Pacemakers)
  - Mike Pinder, rock keyboard player (The Moody Blues)
- 29 December – Ray Thomas, rock flautist and singer-songwriter (The Moody Blues) (died 2018)

== Deaths ==
- 10 January – Frank Bridge, composer, 61
- 19 February – Sir Hamilton Harty, conductor and composer, 61
- 11 March – Sir Walford Davies, composer, 71
- 27 March – Stewart Macpherson, music teacher and writer, 75
- 17 April – Al Bowlly, singer and musician (killed in air raid), 42
- 16 August – John Coates, operatic tenor, 76
- date unknown – William Hargreaves, music hall composer

== See also ==
- 1941 in British television
- 1941 in the United Kingdom
- List of British films of 1941
