= The Necromancers =

The Necromancers is a horror novel by Catholic priest and writer Robert Hugh Benson (1909).

The novel is set in year 1901, to the Spiritualist movement in modern England. The main character of the story is Laurie Baxter, a young man who has lost his love, Amy Nugent, who has died tragically. Laurie seeks consolation from a new occult in hope to get contact to his dead Amy.

The novel was adapted as Spellbound (1941 film).
