= Vera Lindsay =

British actress (1911–1992)

Vera Lindsay (née Poliakoff; 27 November 1911 – 15 June 1992) was a British Shakespearean actress.

== Career ==
Vera Lindsay performed at The Old Vic during the 1930s alongside Laurence Olivier and John Gielgud, and under the direction of Michel Saint-Denis.

She also appeared in a number of early TV productions including Annajanska the Bolshevik Empress (1939), Katharine and Petruchio (1939), The Tempest (1939), Twelfth Night (1939) and Spellbound (1941)

== Personal life ==
Lindsay was daughter of Vladimir Poliakoff. She was married to:

- Major Percy Basil Harmsworth Burton
- News Chronicle editor Sir Gerald Barry; had two sons, one of whom, Stephen, was a stage director and performing arts administrator
- John Russell CBE, a British art critic

== Selected filmography ==
- Spellbound (1941)
