= Playfair Cricket Annual =

British periodical

- Editor: Ian Marshall
- Former editors: Bill Frindall (1986–2009); Gordon Ross (1954–1985); Peter West (1948–1953)
- Categories: Cricket
- Frequency: Annual
- Format: Print (pocket-sized, published each April)
- Publisher: Headline Publishing Group
- Founder: Playfair Books Ltd
- Founded: 1948
- First issue: April 1948
- Country: United Kingdom
- Based in: London, England
- Language: English
- Website: playfaircricket.co.uk

Playfair Cricket Annual is a compact annual about cricket that is published in the United Kingdom each April, just before the English cricket season is due to begin. It has been published every year since 1948. Its main purposes are to review the previous English season and to provide detailed career records and potted biographies of current players. It is produced in a "pocket-sized" format, being approximately 5×4 in (i.e., about 13×10 cm), so that it is a convenient size for carrying to cricket matches. The front cover of each edition has featured a photograph of a prominent current cricketer. There is a popular myth that this "honour" has a "hex" or "curse" associated with it, as the player featured then invariably has a poor season.

== Publications ==
The original publisher was Playfair Books Ltd of London, which had its office at Curzon Street when the first edition was published in April 1948; the company relocated soon afterwards to Haymarket. The name Playfair was chosen because it reads as "play fair", as confirmed by C B Fry who began his foreword to the first edition in 1948: "This Playfair Annual (and what a proper title for a book about the Noble Game) will commend itself to innumerable readers". The first editor was Peter West who was succeeded in 1954 by Gordon Ross. Roy Webber was the statistician at Playfair for many years and was described by West as "that ace of statisticians".

The Playfair Cricket Annual is one of a series of similar pocket sized sporting annuals published under the Playfair name. Others have included Playfair Football Annual, Playfair Rugby League Annual and Playfair Racing Annual. In addition the Playfair name was used for record books produced by Roy Webber and for the magazine Playfair Cricket Monthly. A number of tour brochures were also produced by Playfair Books.

Between 1948 and 1962 the annual was a larger size, 4¾×7¼ in (12×18 cm) and had a different style, being printed on glossy paper and including numerous photographs. In 1962 the Playfair titles were acquired by Dickens Press which had just published The Cricket Annual, edited by Roy Webber. In 1963, Dickens published a new style Playfair Cricket Annual, keeping the same name but basing the size, format and price on The Cricket Annual. Therefore, the 2013 edition is the 66th in total, but the annual has been published in its current compact size only since the 1963 edition (the 16th).

In addition, Playfair Cricket World Cup Guide, in 1996, and Playfair Cricket World Cup 1999 were published in the same format as the regular annual to cover the International limited overs competitions in India/Pakistan/Sri Lanka and England/Scotland/Ireland/Netherlands in those years respectively. Both of those were also edited by Bill Frindall.

The current publisher is Headline Publishing Group with Ian Marshall, who succeeded Bill Frindall on an acting basis in 2009 and permanently for the 2010 edition, as editor. There are several specialist contributors, notably Philip Bailey who compiles the career records.

The following tables provide a summary of each annual by reference to editor, size and price:

=== Larger format: 1948–1962 ===
| Year | Editor | Price | Pages |
|---|---|---|---|
| 1948 | Peter West | 3s 6d | 144 |
| 1949 | Peter West | 3s 6d | 144 |
| 1950 | Peter West | 3s 6d | 176 |
| 1951 | Peter West | 3s 6d | 176 |
| 1952 | Peter West | 5s | 184 |
| 1953 | Peter West | 5s | 192 |
| 1954 | Gordon Ross | 5s | 176 |
| 1955 | Gordon Ross | 5s | 176 |
| 1956 | Gordon Ross | 5s | 176 |
| 1957 | Gordon Ross | 5s | 176 |
| 1958 | Gordon Ross | 5s | 176 |
| 1959 | Gordon Ross | 6s | 176 |
| 1960 | Gordon Ross | 6s | 176 |
| 1961 | Gordon Ross | 6s | 176 |
| 1962 | Gordon Ross | 6s | 176 |

In each of the first 15 editions there was a 16-page photographic section in addition to the numbered pages. The 1948 annual was actually called Playfair Books Cricket Annual but subsequent years were simply called Playfair Cricket Annual. There were two issues of the 1948 annual with a difference in the back cover. One had a Playfair logo, the other a Schweppes advertisement.

=== Compact format: 1963–present ===
Cover of 1963 edition of the Playfair Cricket Annual

For the forerunners to the annual in this format see The Cricket Annual.

| Year | Editor | Cricketer(s) on Front Cover | Cricketer(s) on Back Cover | Price | Pages |
|---|---|---|---|---|---|
| 1963 | Gordon Ross | Garfield Sobers | n/a | 2s 6d | 192 |
| 1964 | Gordon Ross | Bob Simpson | n/a | 2s 6d | 224 |
| 1965 | Gordon Ross | Ken Barrington | n/a | 2s 6d | 224 |
| 1966 | Gordon Ross | Wes Hall | n/a | 3s | 224 |
| 1967 | Gordon Ross | Brian Close | n/a | 3s | 224 |
| 1968 | Gordon Ross | Basil d'Oliveira | n/a | 3s 6d | 224 |
| 1969 | Gordon Ross | Alan Knott | n/a | 3s 6d | 224 |
| 1970 | Gordon Ross | John Edrich | n/a | 4s | 224 |
| 1971 | Gordon Ross | John Snow | n/a | 20p | 224 |
| 1972 | Gordon Ross | Geoff Boycott | n/a | 22p | 224 |
| 1973 | Gordon Ross | Tony Greig | n/a | 25p | 224 |
| 1974 | Gordon Ross | Bishen Bedi | n/a | 35p | 224 |
| 1975 | Gordon Ross | Dennis Amiss | n/a | 50p | 212 |
| 1976 | Gordon Ross | Clive Lloyd | n/a | 50p | 224 |
| 1977 | Gordon Ross | Dennis Lillee | n/a | 60p | 224 |
| 1978 | Gordon Ross | Mike Brearley | n/a | 65p | 224 |
| 1979 | Gordon Ross | Ian Botham | n/a | 75p | 224 |
| 1980 | Gordon Ross | Graham Gooch | n/a | 90p | 240 |
| 1981 | Gordon Ross | Geoff Boycott | n/a | £1 | 240 |
| 1982 | Gordon Ross | Allan Lamb | n/a | £1.10 | 256 |
| 1983 | Gordon Ross | David Gower | n/a | £1.25 | 256 |
| 1984 | Gordon Ross | Viv Richards | n/a | £1.50 | 256 |
| 1985 | Gordon Ross | Paul Downton | n/a | £1.75 | 256 |
| 1986 | Bill Frindall | Allan Border | n/a | £1.75 | 256 |
| 1987 | Bill Frindall | John Emburey | n/a | £1.75 | 256 |
| 1988 | Bill Frindall | Graeme Hick | n/a | £1.75 | 256 |
| 1989 | Bill Frindall | Jack Russell | n/a | £1.75 | 256 |
| 1990 | Bill Frindall | Angus Fraser | n/a | £1.99 | 256 |
| 1991 | Bill Frindall | Robin Smith | n/a | £2.50 | 256 |
| 1992 | Bill Frindall | Phillip DeFreitas | n/a | £2.99 | 256 |
| 1993 | Bill Frindall | Alec Stewart | n/a | £3.99 | 256 |
| 1994 | Bill Frindall | Mike Atherton | n/a | £3.99 | 256 |
| 1995 | Bill Frindall | Darren Gough | n/a | £4.50 | 288 |
| 1996 | Bill Frindall | Wasim Akram | n/a | £4.99 | 288 |
| 1997 | Bill Frindall | Shane Warne & Graham Thorpe | n/a | £4.99 | 288 |
| 1998 | Bill Frindall | Nasser Hussain | Hansie Cronje | £4.99 | 288 |
| 1999 | Bill Frindall | Mark Ramprakash | Allan Donald & Mike Atherton | £4.99 | 288 |
| 2000 | Bill Frindall | Andy Caddick | Jack Russell & Mark Alleyne | £5.99 | 288 |
| 2001 | Bill Frindall | Steve Waugh | Mike Atherton & Alec Stewart | £5.99 | 304 |
| 2002 | Bill Frindall | Marcus Trescothick | Michael Vaughan | £5.99 | 304 |
| 2003 | Bill Frindall | Andrew Flintoff | Mark Butcher | £5.99 | 304 |
| 2004 | Bill Frindall | Michael Vaughan | Brian Lara | £6.99 | 304 |
| 2005 | Bill Frindall | Steve Harmison | The Ashes Urn | £6.99 | 304 |
| 2006 | Bill Frindall | Andrew Flintoff | England team celebrating Ashes victory | £6.99 | 320 |
| 2007 | Bill Frindall | Ian Bell | Sachin Tendulkar | £6.99 | 320 |
| 2008 | Bill Frindall | Monty Panesar | Stephen Fleming | £6.99 | 320 |
| 2009 | Bill Frindall* | Ricky Ponting | Kevin Pietersen | £6.99 | 336 |
| 2010 | Ian Marshall | Andrew Strauss | James Anderson | £6.99 | 336 |
| 2011 | Ian Marshall | Graeme Swann | England Ashes winning team with the Ashes urn | £7.99 | 336 |
| 2012 | Ian Marshall | Kevin Pietersen | Andrew Strauss holding ICC Test mace | £7.99 | 336 |
| 2013 | Ian Marshall | Alastair Cook | Matt Prior | £7.99 | 336 |
| 2014 | Ian Marshall | Stuart Broad | Ian Bell | £8.99 | 336 |
| 2015 | Ian Marshall | Joe Root | Michael Clarke | £8.99 | 336 |
| 2016 | Ian Marshall | Ben Stokes | Moeen Ali | £8.99 | 336 |
| 2017 | Ian Marshall | Jonny Bairstow | Chris Woakes | £9.99 | 336 |
| 2018 | Ian Marshall | James Anderson | Heather Knight | £9.99 | 352 |
| 2019 | Ian Marshall | Jos Buttler | Sam Curran | £9.99 | 352 |
| 2020 | Ian Marshall | Jofra Archer | Eoin Morgan | £9.99 | 352 |
| 2021 | Ian Marshall | Zak Crawley | Joe Root | £9.99 | 336 |
| 2022 | Ian Marshall | Adil Rashid | Heather Knight | £10.99 | 352 |
| 2023 | Ian Marshall | Sam Curran | Ollie Robinson | £10.99 | 352 |
| 2024 | Ian Marshall | Harry Brook | Brendon McCullum and Ben Stokes | £10.99 | 352 |
| 2025 | Ian Marshall | Jamie Smith | Virat Kohli | £10.99 | 352 |
| 2026 | Ian Marshall | Ben Duckett | Gus Atkinson | £10.99 | 352 |

- Bill Frindall died shortly before the 2009 annual was completed, but received sole credit as editor on the front cover. The acknowledgements page credits Ian Marshall as "acting editor". Frindall's traditional preface was written by Jonathan Agnew.

From the 1998 edition onwards a thumbnail picture also appeared on the spine of the annual. This had been a smaller version of the front cover photograph except in 1998 and 2008, when it was the back cover picture, and in 2006, 2010 and 2023 when the Ashes urn was depicted.

=== Compact format: World Cup Guides ===
| Year | Editor | Cricketers on Front Cover | Cricketer on Back Cover and spine | Price | Pages |
|---|---|---|---|---|---|
| 1996 | Bill Frindall | Allan Donald & Brian Lara | n/a | £4.99 | 256 |
| 1999 | Bill Frindall | Arjuna Ranatunga & Glenn McGrath | Sanath Jayasuriya | £4.99 | 288 |

Apart from those on the covers, there are no photographs in any of the annuals from 1963.

== Eleven cricketers of the year ==
From 1950 to 1962 the annual produced a list of its Eleven Cricketers of the Year for the previous season. Tony Lock was selected 7 times, Peter May 6 times.

- 1950: Trevor Bailey, Freddie Brown, Tom Burtt, Martin Donnelly, Tom Goddard, Walter Hadlee, Len Hutton, Roly Jenkins, John Langridge, Reg Simpson, Bert Sutcliffe
- 1951: Godfrey Evans, Laurie Fishlock, Ken Grieves, Gilbert Parkhouse, Sonny Ramadhin, David Sheppard, Roy Tattersall, Alf Valentine, Everton Weekes, Frank Worrell, Doug Wright
- 1952: Bob Appleyard, Alec Bedser, Geoffrey Chubb, Denis Compton, Tom Dollery, Tom Graveney, Jim Laker, Peter May, Jack Robertson, Eric Rowan, Willie Watson
- 1953: Alec Bedser, Brian Close, Godfrey Evans, Tom Graveney, Len Hutton, Jim Laker, Tony Lock, Peter May, David Sheppard, Fred Trueman, Johnny Wardle
- 1954: Trevor Bailey, Alec Bedser, Bruce Dooland, Bill Edrich, Lindsay Hassett, Neil Harvey, Len Hutton, Ray Lindwall, Tony Lock, Peter May, David Sheppard
- 1955: Bob Appleyard, Denis Compton, Bruce Dooland, Les Jackson, Don Kenyon, Jim Laker, Peter Loader, Tony Lock, Fazal Mahmood, Brian Statham, Alan Watkins
- 1956: Colin Cowdrey, Bruce Dooland, Peter Heine, Doug Insole, Tony Lock, Jackie McGlew, Roy Marshall, Brian Statham, Hugh Tayfield, John Waite
- 1957: Denis Compton, Jim Laker, Gil Langley, Tony Lock, Peter May, Keith Miller, Peter Richardson, David Sheppard, Stuart Surridge, George Tribe, Cyril Washbrook
- 1958: Colin Cowdrey, Tom Graveney, Peter Loader, Tony Lock, Peter May, John Murray, Jim Parks, Derek Shackleton, MJK Smith, Collie Smith, Fred Trueman
- 1959: Dennis Brookes, Godfrey Evans, Colin Ingleby-Mackenzie, Les Jackson, Tony Lock, Roy Marshall, Peter May, Arthur Milton, Derek Shackleton, Raman Subba Row, Willie Watson
- 1960: Abbas Ali Baig, Trevor Bailey, Ken Barrington, Ronnie Burnet, Colin Cowdrey, Ray Illingworth, Jim Parks, Geoff Pullar, MJK Smith, Jim Stewart, Bryan Stott
- 1961: Trevor Bailey, Ted Dexter, Norman Horner, Henry Horton, Tony Lewis, Alan Moss, Michael Norman, Eric Russell, Brian Statham, Fred Trueman, Peter Wight
- 1962: Bill Alley, Richie Benaud, Jack Flavell, Colin Ingleby-Mackenzie, Bill Lawry, Ken Mackay, Roy Marshall, John Murray, Peter Parfitt, Derek Shackleton, Raman Subba Row

== County register, averages, and records ==
Since the first compact edition of 1963, the core of the publication has been a section providing a county by county list of current cricketers with potted biographies, their county averages in the previous season together with some introductory notes on the county and the major county records.

The county clubs are listed in alphabetical order. Until 1962, the biographies occupied less space and were not sorted by county club. Introductory information about each county club has expanded, largely because of the introduction of limited overs cricket competitions. A much longer list of officials is now given; originally only the secretary and captain were given. Until 1972 most editions gave potted scores for each club's home matches but lack of space caused this to be removed.

== Current contents ==
Currently, the annual's contents typically include:

- Preface, Foreword and Acknowledgements
- Test Cricket
  - Details of England's records against the touring teams
  - Register of the touring teams
  - Statistical highlights of the previous year
  - Scorecards of the previous year
  - Test umpires
  - Current career averages
  - Test match records
- County Cricket
  - County register, averages and records
  - Umpires register
  - Touring team registers
  - Statistical highlights of the previous season
  - Competition results and tables
  - Cricketer of the year awards
  - First-class averages for the season
  - First-class career averages
  - List 'A' career averages
  - T20 career averages
  - First-class records
- Limited over and T20 Internationals
  - Career averages
  - Records
- Other Cricket
  - Indian Premier League
  - The Men's Hundred
  - Women's cricket
- Fixtures

== Status of matches ==
As one of the leading statistical cricket publications, Playfair has to take a view on the status of Test, One Day International, first-class and domestic one-day (i.e. List A) matches. It generally complies with the statistics published by Wisden Cricketers' Almanack and will sometimes ignore official rulings: e.g., the ICC ruling that South African rebel tours between 1981–82 and 1989–90 were not first-class matches. The 2010 edition overturned Frindall's long-held view that the match between Australia and an ICC World XI in 2005/06 should not be regarded as a Test Match and now includes it in its Test record section.
