= Miles Thomas =

Welsh businessman from Wrexham (1897–1980)

William Miles Webster Thomas, Baron Thomas DFC (2 March 1897 – 8 February 1980), known as Sir Miles Thomas from 1943–1971, was a Welsh businessman. He was Managing Director of the Morris Motors, 1940–1947, Chairman of the British Overseas Airways Corporation (BOAC, later to become British Airways), 1949–1956, Chairman of the merger broker Chesham Amalgamations, and President and Chairman of the National Savings Committee.

== Early life ==
He was born in 1897 in Cefn Mawr, Wrexham, Wales, the son of a property owner who died the following year. He went to Bromsgrove School in Worcestershire, England.

== War service 1914-18 ==
After school, during which time his major interests were engineering and transport, in World War I, he joined an Armoured Car Squadron. After fighting through the German East African Campaign, he transferred to the Royal Flying Corps qualifying for his wings in Egypt. He subsequently served with an operational squadron in Mesopotamia, Persia and south Russia, being awarded the Distinguished Flying Cross (DFC) for aerial combat and low ground strafing.

== Post war ==
After the First World War, he became a journalist working initially at Hiffe and Temple Press, working on The Motor magazine. He was later promoted to editor of Light Car magazine.

On one assignment, he conducted a press interview with William Morris (later Lord Nuffield), and Morris was so impressed with his 'clarity of thought' that he offered Thomas employment. Soon, Thomas was in de facto charge of sales and purchasing at Morris Motors, where he came up with the idea of producing a magazine for owners and dealers, in order to bring about brand loyalty. To achieve this, Morris created the Morris Oxford Press (later to become the Nuffield Press and placed Thomas in charge. The press produced a wide range of materials for the Nuffield Organization including promotional magazines, brochures, and paperwork.

Thomas' success at the press led to promotion, including being involved in the formation of the Pressed Steel Company subsidiary of Morris, and then becoming General Manager of Wolseley Motors in 1933, taking charge of developing the Wolseley Wasp, Wolseley Hornet and Morris Fourteen, before becoming Managing Director in 1937.

In 1940, he was promoted to Vice-Chairman of Morris Motors, and was instrumental in the Nuffield Organization war contribution, including being Chairman of the Cruiser Tank Production Group, and a member of the Government's Advisory Committee.

He was knighted in 1943.

Thomas left Morris Motors in 1947 to take up a post as deputy Chairman at the British Overseas Airways Corporation (BOAC), where he introduced the de Havilland Comet, the world's first jet airliner. This made him the public face of BOAC during the high-profile losses of Comet aircraft between 1952 and 1954.

In 1956 he resigned after a row with Harold Watkinson then Minister of Transport and Thomas was elected as chairman of the board of Monsanto Chemical Ltd. The company had just opened a new UK Head Office at Monsanto House (the name signs now covered over), 10-18 Victoria Street, London SW1H 0NB and had acquired a large chemical plant in Cefn Mawr, Thomas' birthplace. HRH Prince Philip opened the building and a plaque still remains on the ground floor on what has been occupied by the Board of Trade partially since the late 1960s and wholly since Monsanto relocated its UK offices to Basingstoke in the late 1970s. He later took other board appointments including Britannia Airways. In 1962 he was invited to deliver the MacMillan Memorial Lecture to the Institution of Engineers and Shipbuilders in Scotland. He chose the subject "Air and Sea Transport-Friends or Foes?".

In 1960, he became President of the National Farmers' Union.

His autobiography was published in 1964.

On 29 January 1971, Thomas was created a life peer as Baron Thomas, of Remenham, in the Royal County of Berkshire.

== Personal life ==
On 2 June 1924 he married Hylda Church, who had been William Morris's secretary. They had a daughter, Sheila, (1925-2019), and a son, Michael (1926).

== See also ==
- Get Ahead - 1950s and 60s BBC television series.

== Publications ==
- Thomas, Miles (1964). Out on a Wing: An Autobiography. Michael Joseph, London.

Business positions
Preceded by Harold B. Hartley	BOAC Chairman; 1949–1956	Succeeded by Gerard d'Erlanger
