= 1941 in British television =

This is a list of British television-related events from 1941.

== Events ==
British television did not broadcast in 1941. Television had been suspended since 1939 for the duration of the Second World War, due to fears that the signals would help German bombers. Television broadcasting resumed in 1946.

== Births ==
- 8 January – Graham Chapman, comedy writer-performer (died 1989)
- 19 January – Tony Anholt, Singaporean-English actor (died 2002)
- 10 February – Michael Apted, director (died 2021)
- 24 March – Humphrey Barclay, comedy producer
- 4 April – Bill Tarmey, actor (died 2012)
- 7 April
  - Peter Fluck, caricaturist (died 2026)
  - Gorden Kaye, comic actor (died 2017)
- 9 April – Hannah Gordon, Scottish-born actress
- 18 May – Miriam Margolyes, actress
- 14 June – Mike Yarwood, impressionist and comedian (died 2023)
- 25 June – Eddie Large, born Edward McGinnis, Scottish-born comedian (died 2020)
- 7 July
  - Christopher Beeny, actor (died 2020)
  - Bill Oddie, comedy writer-performer, songwriter and natural history presenter (died 2026)
- 29 July – David Warner, English actor (died 2022)
- 4 August – Martin Jarvis, actor
- 5 October – Stephanie Cole, actress (died 2026)
- 20 October – Anneke Wills, actress
- 28 October – John Hallam, actor (died 2006)
- 17 November – Graham Haberfield, actor (died 1975)
- 18 November – David Hemmings, English actor (died 2003)
- 24 December – John Levene, actor
- 31 December
  - Johnny Leeze, actor (died 2020)
  - Sarah Miles, theatre, film and television actress

== Deaths ==
- 10 May – S. J. Warmington, actor, killed by enemy action (born 1884)

== See also ==
- 1941 in British music
- 1941 in the United Kingdom
- List of British films of 1941
