= Football Annual =

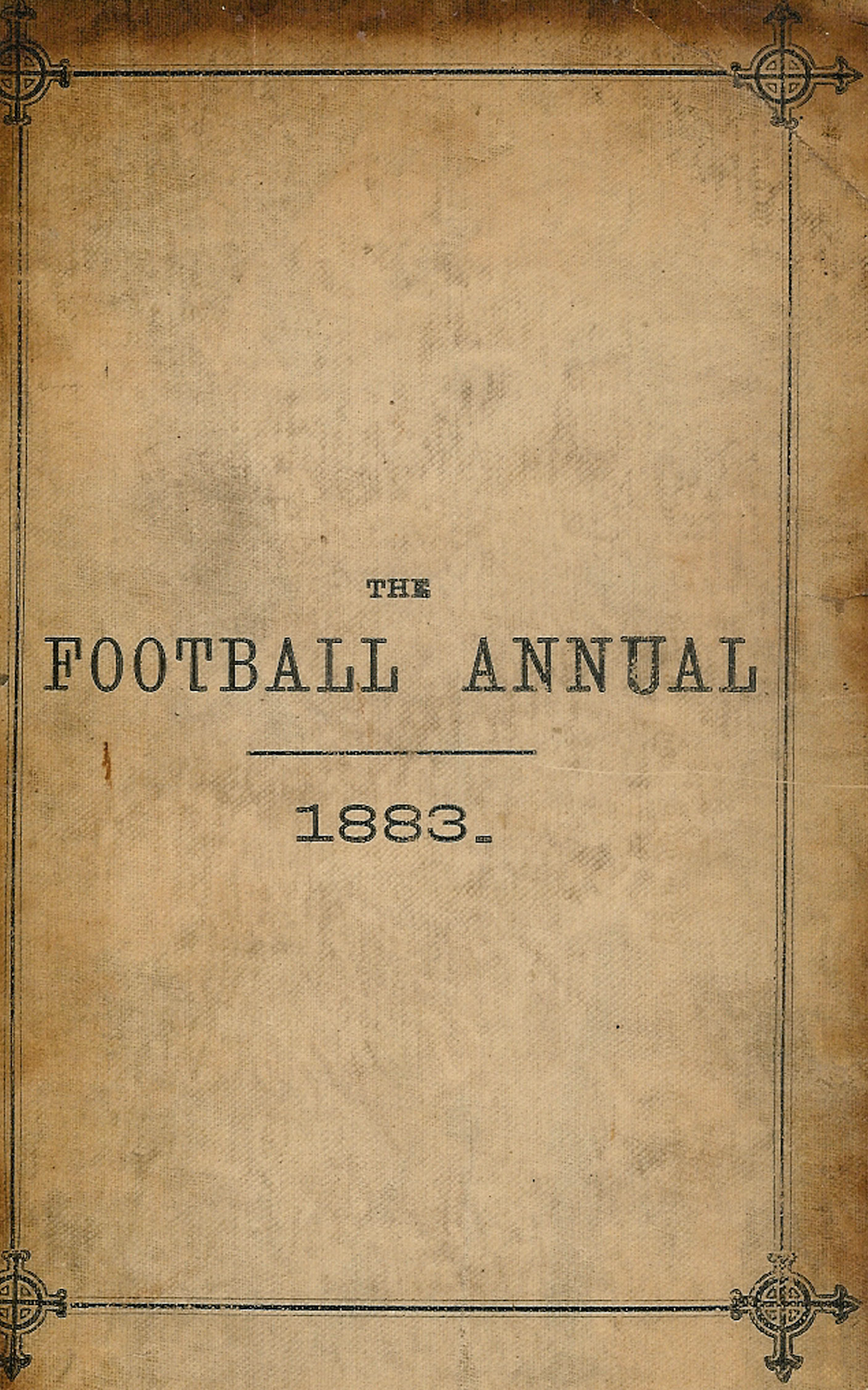
Front cover of the 1883 edition

The Football Annual was a reference work published annually from 1868 to 1908. It reported on the various codes of football played in England, and also provided some coverage of the other home nations, supplemented on occasion by reports from around the world. While association and rugby football provided its main focus, it also included some material on public school football, Sheffield football (until that code merged with association football in 1877), and, on occasion, even Australian and American football. A typical issue would include laws of the various codes, a summary of the preceding season, a listing of football clubs in England (including such details as each club's ground, secretary, and colours), and essays about aspects of the game.

The Football Annual was edited for almost its entire existence by Charles Alcock. Upon Alcock's death in early 1907, the two final editions were edited by others. It ceased publication after the 1908 edition.

== List of editions ==
- Alcock, Charles W., ed. (1868). John Lillywhite's Football Annual. London: John Lillywhite.
- Alcock, Charles W., ed. (1869). Football Annual. London: Sportsman.
- Alcock, Charles W., ed. (1870). Football Annual. London: Sportsman.
- Alcock, Charles W., ed. (1871). Football Annual. London: Virtue.
- Alcock, Charles W., ed. (1872). Football Annual. London: Virtue.
- Alcock, Charles W., ed. (1873). Football Annual. London: Virtue.
- Alcock, Charles W., ed. (1874). Football Annual. London: Virtue.
- Alcock, Charles W., ed. (1875). Football Annual. London: Virtue.
- Alcock, Charles W., ed. (1876). Football Annual. London: Ward, Lock, & Tyler.
- Alcock, Charles W., ed. (1877). Football Annual. London.
- Alcock, Charles W., ed. (1878). Football Annual. London: Cricket Press.
- Alcock, Charles W., ed. (1879). Football Annual. London: Cricket Press.
- Alcock, Charles W., ed. (1880). Football Annual. London: Cricket Press.
- Alcock, Charles W., ed. (1881). Football Annual.
- Alcock, Charles W., ed. (1882). Football Annual. London: Cricket Press.
- Alcock, Charles W., ed. (1883). Football Annual. London: Cricket Press.
- Alcock, Charles W., ed. (1884). Football Annual. London: Wright & Co.
- Alcock, Charles W., ed. (1886). Football Annual. London: Wright & Co.
- Alcock, Charles W., ed. (1887). Football Annual. London: Wright & Co.
- Alcock, Charles W., ed. (1888). Football Annual. London: Wright & Co.
- Alcock, Charles W., ed. (1892). Football Annual. London: Wright & Co.
- Alcock, Charles W., ed. (1897). Football Annual. Merritt & Hatcher.
- Alcock, Charles W., ed. (1898). Football Annual. Merritt & Hatcher.
- Alcock, Charles W., ed. (1899). Football Annual. Merritt & Hatcher.
- Alcock, Charles W., ed. (1900). Football Annual. Merritt & Hatcher.
- Alcock, Charles W., ed. (1901). Football Annual. Merritt & Hatcher.
- Alcock, Charles W., ed. (1902). Football Annual. Merritt & Hatcher.
- Alcock, Charles W., ed. (1903). Football Annual.
- Alcock, Charles W., ed. (1904). Football Annual. Merritt & Hatcher.
- Alcock, Charles W., ed. (1905). Football Annual. Merritt & Hatcher.
- Alcock, Charles W., ed. (1906). Football Annual. Merritt & Hatcher.
- Football Annual. London: "Cricket" offices. 1907.
- Football Annual. London: Merritt & Hatcher. 1908.

== See also ==
- Athletic News Football Annual (a rival annual, dating from 1887, which is still in existence as the Nationwide Football Annual)
- James Lillywhite's Cricketers' Annual (a similar publication for cricket, also edited by Alcock)
