= Gerald Barry (British journalist) =

British newspaper editor (1898–1968)

Barry in 1951.

Sir Gerald Barry (20 November 1898 – 21 November 1968) was a British newspaper editor and organiser of the Festival of Britain in 1951.

According to historian F. M. Leventhal, Barry was a long-time newspaper editor, with left-leaning, middle-brow views. He was not seen as a Labour ideologue. He selected the next rank of Festival organizers, giving preference to young architects and designers who had collaborated on exhibitions for the wartime Ministry of Information.

Born in Surbiton, Barry studied at Marlborough College, and planned to continue his education at Corpus Christi College, Cambridge, but instead joined the Royal Flying Corps then, on its establishment, the Royal Air Force. In 1919, he took a post as a journalist at the Daily Express, and, in 1921, he moved to the Saturday Review as assistant editor, becoming editor in 1924. He resigned in 1930, refusing an order from the board of directors to support the United Empire Party.

He was immediately appointed editor of the new Week-end Review, an article in which prompted the formation of the Political and Economic Planning think-tank; Barry was appointed as a founder member.

When the Week-end Review merged with the New Statesman in 1934, Barry joined its board of directors. Meanwhile, he took a post as features editor of the News Chronicle, succeeding Aylmer Vallance as editor in 1936, serving until 1947. The following year, he was appointed director-general of the Festival of Britain, with responsibility for selecting and leading the team which organised the event.

He was knighted in the 1951 Birthday Honours. After the festival, Barry served on a variety of quangos, and in 1959 took charge of educational programming for Granada Television.

== Personal life and death ==
His wives included actress Vera Lindsay. His son, Stephen Barry (1945–2000) became a producer and director. Another son, Christopher Barry (1925–2014), was also a director.

Barry died on 21 November 1968, the day after his 70th birthday.

Media offices
Preceded by Aylmer Vallance	Editor of the News Chronicle; 1936–1947	Succeeded by Robin Cruikshank
