= Nationwide Football Annual =

The Nationwide Football Annual is a compact British football reference book which is produced at the start of each football season. It contains information from the previous football season, and also contains updated records going back to the beginnings of organised football in the 1800s.

This publication first appeared in 1887, produced by the Athletic News as a rival to the Football Annual. Like the older publication, it initially aimed to provided coverage of all football codes popular in England, including rugby football (both rugby union and rugby league after the codes split) in addition to association football. The final edition to date was published in the summer of 2022 for the 2022-23 season, as no deal could be agreed between the authors and prospective publishers for the 2023-24 edition.

The titles of this publication have been:-

- 1887-88 to 1889-90 : Athletic News Football Supplement & Club Directory
- 1890-91 to 1945-46 : Athletic News Football Annual
- 1946-47 to 1955-56 : Sunday Chronicle Football Annual
- 1956-57 to 1960-61 : Empire News & Sunday Chronicle Football Annual
- 1961-62 to 1964-65 : News of the World & Empire News Football Annual
- 1965-66 to 2007-08 : News of the World Football Annual
- 2008-09 to 2022-23 : Nationwide Football Annual

Two long-serving previous editors were 'Tityrus' (otherwise J A H Catton, editor of the Athletic News 1900–1924) and Ivan Sharpe (c. 1928–1956). Other editors or joint-editors appearing on the front covers or title pages include David Jack (1956–1958 – he also made later contributions, not to be confused with the England footballer of the same name); Malcolm Gunn (1958–1966); Frank Butler (1961–1982); Patrick Collins (1967–1977); Harold Mayes (1978); Charles Sampson (1983–1984); Albert Sewell (1983–1997); Bill Bateson (1985–1994) and Eric Brown (1998–1999).

The book has incorporated a number of illustrations for many years, and since 1948 these have regularly included team photos of a few of the previous season's most successful sides. Since 1985 the annual has also included very brief obituaries ('The Final Whistle') for selected former players and officials dying within the previous twelve months.

Following the withdrawal of News of the World as sponsors, the Nationwide Building Society emerged to provide new sponsorship in 2008. This sponsorship lasted for two years, with the title Nationwide Football Annual being retained after the end of the sponsorship.

Facsimile copies of the Athletic News Football Annuals for 1887-88 to 1900-01 and 1915-16 to 1918-19, were produced by the Association of Football Statisticians during the 1980s.

== Details ==
Editions produced since 1946:-

Year	Edition	Title	Editor	Price	Pages
1946-47	60th	Sunday Chronicle Football Annual	Ivan Sharpe	1s	320
1947-48	61st	Sunday Chronicle Football Annual	Ivan Sharpe	1s	320
1948-49	62nd	Sunday Chronicle Football Annual	Ivan Sharpe	1s 6d	352
1949-50	63rd	Sunday Chronicle Football Annual	Ivan Sharpe	1s 6d	352
1950-51	64th	Sunday Chronicle Football Annual	Ivan Sharpe	1s 6d	352
1951-52	65th	Sunday Chronicle Football Annual	Ivan Sharpe	1s 6d	352
1952-53	66th	Sunday Chronicle Football Annual	Ivan Sharpe	1s 6d	352
1953-54	67th	Sunday Chronicle Football Annual	Ivan Sharpe	1s 6d	352
1954-55	68th	Sunday Chronicle Football Annual	Ivan Sharpe	1s 6d	384
1955-56	69th	Sunday Chronicle Football Annual	Ivan Sharpe	1s 6d	352
1956-57	70th	Empire News & Sunday Chronicle Football Annual	Ivan Sharpe & David Jack	1s 6d	352
1957-58	71st	Empire News & Sunday Chronicle Football Annual	David Jack	2s	384
1958-59	72nd	Empire News & Sunday Chronicle Football Annual	David Jack	2s 6d	384
1959-60	73rd	Empire News & Sunday Chronicle Football Annual	David Jack & Malcolm Gunn	2s 6d	384
1960-61	74th	Empire News & Sunday Chronicle Football Annual	David Jack & Malcolm Gunn	2s 6d	384
1961-62	75th	News of the World & Empire News Football Annual	Frank Butler & Malcolm Gunn	3s 6d	384
1962-63	76th	News of the World & Empire News Football Annual	Frank Butler & Malcolm Gunn	3s 6d	384
1963-64	77th	News of the World & Empire News Football Annual	Frank Butler & Malcolm Gunn	3s 6d	384
1964-65	78th	News of the World & Empire News Football Annual	Frank Butler & Malcolm Gunn	3s 6d	384
1965-66	79th	News of the World Football Annual	Frank Butler & Malcolm Gunn	4s 6d	384
1966-67	80th	News of the World Football Annual	Frank Butler & Malcolm Gunn	4s 6d	384
1967-68	81st	News of the World Football Annual	Frank Butler & Patrick Collins	4s 6d	384
1968-69	82nd	News of the World Football Annual	Frank Butler & Patrick Collins	4s 6d	384
1969-70	83rd	News of the World Football Annual	Frank Butler & Patrick Collins	5s	384
1970-71	84th	News of the World Football Annual	Frank Butler & Patrick Collins	5s	400
1971-72	85th	News of the World Football Annual	Frank Butler & Patrick Collins	25p	384
1972-73	86th	News of the World Football Annual	Frank Butler & Patrick Collins	25p	384
1973-74	87th	News of the World Football Annual	Frank Butler & Patrick Collins	30p	384
1974-75	88th	News of the World Football Annual	Frank Butler & Patrick Collins	35p	384
1975-76	89th	News of the World Football Annual	Frank Butler & Patrick Collins	40p	384
1976-77	90th	News of the World Football Annual	Frank Butler & Patrick Collins	50p	384
1977-78	91st	News of the World Football Annual	Frank Butler & Patrick Collins	60p	384
1978-79	92nd	News of the World Football Annual	Frank Butler & Harold Mayes	75p	384
1979-80	93rd	News of the World Football Annual	Frank Butler	80p	384
1980-81	94th	News of the World Football Annual	Frank Butler	85p	383
1981-82	95th	News of the World Football Annual	Frank Butler	95p	384
1982-83	96th	News of the World Football Annual	Frank Butler	95p	384
1983-84	97th	News of the World Football Annual	Charles Sampson & Albert Sewell	£1.25	384
1984-85	98th	News of the World Football Annual	Charles Sampson & Albert Sewell	£1.50	384
1985-86	99th	News of the World Football Annual	Bill Bateson & Albert Sewell	£1.75	382
1986-87	100th	News of the World Football Annual	Bill Bateson & Albert Sewell	£1.95	384
1987-88	101st	News of the World Football Annual	Bill Bateson & Albert Sewell	£2.50	384
1988-89	102nd	News of the World Football Annual	Bill Bateson & Albert Sewell	£2.75	384
1989-90	103rd	News of the World Football Annual	Bill Bateson & Albert Sewell	£2.99	384
1990-91	104th	News of the World Football Annual	Bill Bateson & Albert Sewell	£3.50	432
1991-92	105th	News of the World Football Annual	Bill Bateson & Albert Sewell	£3.75	432
1992-93	106th	News of the World Football Annual	Bill Bateson & Albert Sewell	£3.75	432
1993-94	107th	News of the World Football Annual	Bill Bateson & Albert Sewell	£3.99	432
1994-95	108th	News of the World Football Annual	Bill Bateson & Albert Sewell	£3.99	432
1995-96	109th	News of the World Football Annual	Albert Sewell	£4.25	432
1996-97	110th	News of the World Football Annual	Albert Sewell	£4.99	480
1997-98	111th	News of the World Football Annual	Albert Sewell	£4.99	480
1998-99	112th	News of the World Football Annual	Eric Brown	£5.99	480
1999-00	113th	News of the World Football Annual	Eric Brown	£5.99	480
2000-01	114th	News of the World Football Annual	Stuart Barnes	£5.99	480
2001-02	115th	News of the World Football Annual	Stuart Barnes	£5.99	480
2002-03	116th	News of the World Football Annual	Stuart Barnes	£5.99	512
2003-04	117th	News of the World Football Annual	Stuart Barnes	£6.99	512
2004-05	118th	News of the World Football Annual	Stuart Barnes	£6.99	528
2005-06	119th	News of the World Football Annual	Stuart Barnes	£6.99	528
2006-07	120th	News of the World Football Annual	Stuart Barnes	£6.99	528
2007-08	121st	News of the World Football Annual	Stuart Barnes	£6.99	528
2008-09	122nd	Nationwide Football Annual	Stuart Barnes	£6.99	544
2009-10	123rd	Nationwide Football Annual	Stuart Barnes	£6.99	544
2010-11	124th	Nationwide Football Annual	Stuart Barnes	£6.99	544
2011-12	125th	Nationwide Football Annual	Stuart Barnes	£7.99	544
2012-13	126th	Nationwide Football Annual	Stuart Barnes	£7.99	544
2013-14	127th	Nationwide Football Annual	Stuart Barnes	£7.99	544
2014-15	128th	Nationwide Football Annual	Stuart Barnes	£7.99	544
2015-16	129th	Nationwide Football Annual	Stuart Barnes	£7.99	544
2016-17	130th	Nationwide Football Annual	Stuart Barnes	£8.99	544
2017-18	131st	Nationwide Football Annual	Stuart Barnes	£8.99	544
2018-19	132nd	Nationwide Football Annual	Stuart Barnes	£8.99	544
2019-20	133rd	Nationwide Football Annual	Stuart Barnes	£8.99	544
2020-21	134th	Nationwide Football Annual	Stuart Barnes	£8.99	544
2021-22	135th	Nationwide Football Annual	Stuart Barnes	£8.99	544
2022-23	136th	Nationwide Football Annual	Stuart Barnes	£9.99	544

== See also ==
- Football Annual (published from 1868 to 1908)
- The Football Yearbook (published from 1970 to the present)
- Playfair Football Annual (published from 1948 to 2012)
