= Playfair Football Annual =

Playfair Football Annual is a compact football annual. It is a reference book primarily covering football in England, Scotland and Europe. It was first published in 1948. It was last published in 2012/13. From 1988, it was edited by Jack Rollin (and later with his daughter Glenda) who also edited The Football Yearbook.

== See also ==
- Playfair Cricket Annual (a similar reference work for cricket, first produced in 1948)
