= Aylmer Vallance =

Gerald Aylmer Vallance (4 July 1892 – 24 November 1955), born George Alexander Gerald Vallance, was a Scottish newspaper editor.

== Career ==
Born in Partick, Vallance studied at Fettes College in Edinburgh and Balliol College, Oxford, before serving with the Somerset Light Infantry and the General Staff of the 2nd Indian Division during World War I. After the war, he was appointed as General Secretary of the National Maritime Board and became a director of the Political Research Bureau.

From 1930 to 1933, Vallance was assistant editor of The Economist. He was then appointed editor of the News Chronicle, which he took in a more radical direction, investigating and critically reporting on the British Union of Fascists, and recruiting writers such as Vernon Bartlett, Tangye Lean, Ian Mackay and Gerald Barry. He also launched a Saturday supplement on green newsprint. However, he resigned in 1936 after pressure from subeditors over his persistent drunkenness and lukewarm support for the Liberal Party. He spent the remainder of the decade as an occasional contributor to the Evening Standard, and was finance editor of the New Statesman from 1937 to 1939.

During World War II, Vallance was a lieutenant-colonel, working as the liaison between the War Office and the Political Warfare Executive. A supporter of the communist Partisans, he named a son Tito, after Josip Broz Tito. From 1950 to 1955, he returned to the New Statesman as assistant editor. He also wrote several books, on the press and on economic affairs.

== Personal life ==
In 1928 he married Phyllis Taylor Birnstingl, née Reid. They were divorced in 1940. He subsequently married Helen Chisholm, née Gosse the same year. They had two children, a son, Tito, and a daughter, Margaret. Again the marriage ended in divorce. Finally in 1950, he married Ute Christina Fischinger, daughter of German Army officer Max Fischinger and German resistance fighter Hilde Schneider. After his death, Ute married photographer and physician Nico Jesse in 1961.

Media offices
Preceded by Tom Clarke	Editor of the News Chronicle; 1933–1936	Succeeded by Gerald Barry
