= The Cricket Annual =

- The Cricket Annual (1961)
- Editor: Roy Webber
- Former editors: Crawford White (to 1960, earlier continuity title); Frank Thorogood (1922–1939, earlier continuity title); Percy Rudd (1946, earlier continuity title)
- Categories: Cricket
- Frequency: Annual
- Format: Print (compact/pocket-sized annual)
- Publisher: Dickens Press
- Founded: 1961 (final title of a series dating to 1895)
- First issue: 1961
- Final issue: 1962
- Country: United Kingdom
- Language: English

The Cricket Annual was a compact cricket annual publication published in 1961 and 1962. This was the final name of a cricket annual that had first appeared in 1895, and was before it was re-named to become the re-styled Playfair Cricket Annual.

In 1962 the Playfair titles (including the Playfair Cricket Annual) were acquired by Dickens Press which had just published The Cricket Annual. In November 1962 editor Roy Webber died suddenly and the decision was made to combine the two annuals so that in 1963, Dickens published a new style Playfair Cricket Annual, using the same name but basing the size, format and price on The Cricket Annual.

== Background ==
The Cricket Annual was one in a long line of publications starting in 1895, with many different titles but with a continuity of format and style. They are pocket book size (approx 9.8 x 13.6 cm) but pre-1928 inaccurately trimmed and size varies (1906 is 8.9 x 13 cm). Pre-1915 books usually contained 96 pages (1908 = 80). From 1904–1914 they were edited by Alfred Gibson (Rover) and then for one year in 1921 by 'Mentor'. From 1922 until 1939 the editor was Frank Thorogood, in 1946 Percy Rudd, and then Crawford White until 1957 when he was joined by Roy Webber. Good quality copies prior to 1921 are rare and the 1895–1899 Star and Leader Cricket Manuals is difficult to find in any condition. The early annuals (pre-1914) sold for one penny (1d). When they reappeared after the First World War the price was 4d (1923 2d) and then in 1929 reduced to 3d until 1939. Post-1946, as the number of pages grew, the cost rose in increments from 6d to one shilling and six pence (1/6) by 1957.

Titles

- 1895–1899 Star and Leader Cricket Manual
- 1900–1908 Morning Leader Cricket Annual
- 1909–1911 Morning Leader Cricket and Sports Annual
- 1912 Morning Leader Cricket Annual
- 1913–1914 Daily News and Leader Cricket Annual
- 1921–1926 Daily News Cricket and Tennis Annual
- 1927–1930 Daily News Cricket Annual
- 1931–1939 News Chronicle Cricket Annual
- 1946–1956 News Chronicle Cricket Annual
- 1957–1958 News Chronicle & Daily Dispatch Cricket Annual
- 1959–1960 News Chronicle Cricket Annual
- 1961–1962 The Cricket Annual
- 1963-date Playfair Cricket Annual

== Details ==
Editions produced since 1928:-

Year	Title	Editor	Price	Pages
1928	Daily News Cricket Annual	Frank Thorogood	4d	128
1929	Daily News Cricket Annual	Frank Thorogood	3d	128
1930	Daily News Cricket Annual	Frank Thorogood	3d	128
1931	News Chronicle Cricket Annual	Frank Thorogood	3d	128
1932	News Chronicle Cricket Annual	Frank Thorogood	3d	128
1933	News Chronicle Cricket Annual	Frank Thorogood	3d	128
1934	News Chronicle Cricket Annual	Frank Thorogood	3d	128
1935	News Chronicle Cricket Annual	Frank Thorogood	3d	128
1936	News Chronicle Cricket Annual	Frank Thorogood	3d	128
1937	News Chronicle Cricket Annual	Frank Thorogood	3d	128
1938	News Chronicle Cricket Annual	Frank Thorogood	3d	128
1939	News Chronicle Cricket Annual	Frank Thorogood	3d	128
1946	News Chronicle Cricket Annual	Percy Rudd	6d	80
1947	News Chronicle Cricket Annual	Crawford White	9d	96
1948	News Chronicle Cricket Annual	Crawford White	1s	96
1949	News Chronicle Cricket Annual	Crawford White	1s	112
1950	News Chronicle Cricket Annual	Crawford White	1s	144
1951	News Chronicle Cricket Annual	Crawford White	1s	144
1952	News Chronicle Cricket Annual	Crawford White	1s	144
1953	News Chronicle Cricket Annual	Crawford White	1s	144
1954	News Chronicle Cricket Annual	Crawford White	1s	160
1955	News Chronicle Cricket Annual	Crawford White	1s	160
1956	News Chronicle Cricket Annual	Crawford White	1s	144
1957	News Chronicle & Daily Dispatch Cricket Annual	Crawford White	1s 6d	192
1958	News Chronicle & Daily Dispatch Cricket Annual	Crawford White	1s 6d	192
1959	News Chronicle Cricket Annual	Crawford White & Roy Webber	1s 6d	192
1960	News Chronicle Cricket Annual	Crawford White & Roy Webber	1s 6d	192
1961	The Cricket Annual	Roy Webber	2s	192
1962	The Cricket Annual	Roy Webber	2s 6d	192

For editions of the annual 1963–present see the Playfair Cricket Annual.
