= 1941 in the United Kingdom =

Events from the year 1941 in the United Kingdom. The year was dominated by the Second World War.

== Incumbents ==
- Monarch – George VI
- Prime Minister – Winston Churchill (Coalition)

== Events ==
- 9 January – Avro Manchester Mark III BT308, prototype of the Avro Lancaster heavy bomber, first flies, from RAF Ringway.
- 19 January – British troops attack Italian-held Eritrea.
- 20 January – Firewatching mandatory for business premises, to limit incendiary damage.
- 21 January – the Daily Worker, newspaper of the Communist Party of Great Britain, is suppressed by the (Labour) Home Secretary in the Churchill war ministry, Herbert Morrison (until September 1942) in view of its continuing pro-Soviet stance.
- 21–22 January – Battle of Tobruk: Australian and British forces attack and capture Tobruk (Libya) from the Italians.
- 31 January – German spy Josef Jakobs parachutes into the village of Ramsey, Cambridgeshire; he breaks his ankle on landing and is immediately arrested.
- 5 February – Air Training Corps formed.
- 11 February – RMS Queen Elizabeth begins her first voyage as a troopship, from Singapore.
- 12 February – Reserve Constable Albert Alexander, a patient at the Radcliffe Infirmary in Oxford, becomes the first person treated with penicillin intravenously, by Howard Florey’s team. He reacts positively but there is insufficient supply of the drug to reverse his terminal infection. A successful treatment is achieved during May.
- 19 February – "Three nights' Blitz" over Swansea, South Wales, begins. 230 are killed and 409 injured.
- February – white flour is replaced by "National flour", a wholemeal flour.
- 2 March – John Gilbert Winant takes up post as United States Ambassador to the United Kingdom in succession to Joseph P. Kennedy; he will serve for 5 years.
- 11 March
  - President Franklin D. Roosevelt signs the Lend-Lease Act into United States law, allowing the country to supply military equipment to Britain.
  - Luftwaffe air raids on Manchester cause extensive damage to the city, a notable casualty being Old Trafford football stadium, home of Manchester United, which is severely damaged.
- 13 March – Clydebank Blitz: bombing of Clydebank. 528 people die, 617 more are seriously injured, and hundreds more are injured by blast debris. Another 35,000 people are made homeless.
- 15 March – Plymouth Blitz: bombing of Plymouth. 336 people lose their lives.
- 27–29 March – Battle of Cape Matapan: Off the Peloponnesus coast in the Mediterranean, British naval forces defeat those of Italy sinking five warships.
- 15 April – Belfast Blitz: Belfast is heavily bombed, killing 900 and injuring 1,500.
- 7 April – Budget Day: Chancellor of the Exchequer Kingsley Wood presents a Keynesian budget that increases taxes; for the first time in British history, a majority of the population is liable to income tax.
- 18 April – heaviest air-raid of the year on London.
- 21 April – Greece capitulates. British troops withdraw to Crete.
- May
  - The Ministry of Information issues more than 14 million copies of a leaflet Beating the Invader, with a preface from Churchill, giving advice on what to do "if invasion comes".
  - Meatless Woolton pie introduced.
- 2–8 May – 'May Week Raids', sustained heavy bombing on Merseyside, result in over 1,700 deaths and well over 1,000 injuries.
- 6–7 May – Greenock Blitz: Greenock in Scotland is intensively bombed. 280 people are killed, and 1,200 more injured.
- 9 May – German submarine U-110 is captured by the Royal Navy in the North Atlantic with its Enigma cryptography machine and codebooks intact.
- 10 May
  - The House of Commons is damaged by the Luftwaffe in an air raid.
  - Rudolf Hess parachutes into Scotland claiming to be on a peace mission.
- 15 May – first British jet aircraft, the Gloster E.28/39, is flown at RAF Cranwell in Lincolnshire.

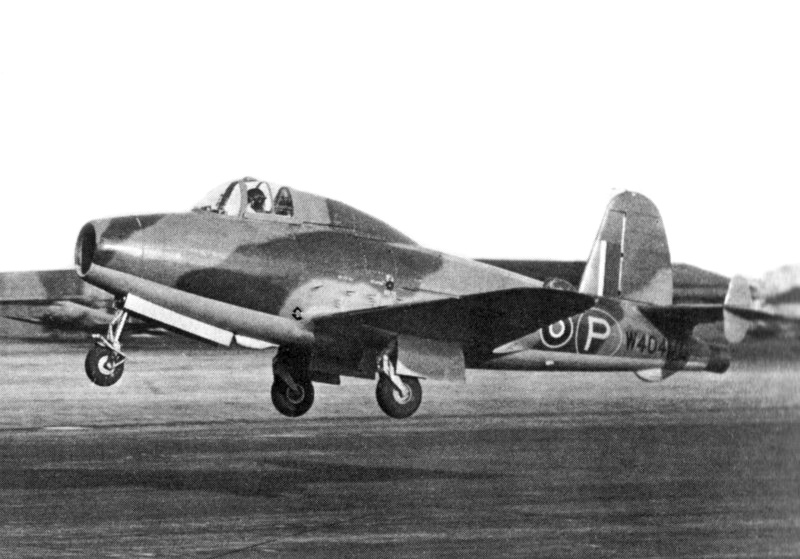
The Gloster E.28/39, the first British aircraft to fly with a turbojet engine

- 17 May – Tipton, near Dudley in the midlands, is bombed by the Luftwaffe for the second time in six months, with a further six civilian deaths.
- 24 May – in the North Atlantic, the German battleship Bismarck sinks HMS Hood killing all but three crewmen on what was the pride of the Royal Navy.
- 26 May – in the North Atlantic, Fairey Swordfish biplanes from the carrier HMS Ark Royal fatally cripple the German battleship Bismarck in a torpedo attack.
- May – Emergency Work (Merchant Navy) Order requires merchant seamen to serve for the duration, establishes a Merchant Navy Reserve Pool of labour, and guarantees a wage (which will continue in the event of shipwreck).
- 1 June – clothes rationing introduced.
- 4 June – Britain invades Iraq; the pro-Axis government there is overthrown.
- June – Noël Coward's comedy Blithe Spirit is premiered at Manchester Opera House. Opening in London on 2 July, its run of 1,997 consecutive performances sets a record for non-musical plays in the West End theatre which will not be surpassed for more than twenty years.
- 12 July – Anglo-Soviet Agreement signed for mutual co-operation following the Nazi invasion of the Soviet Union.
- August – Political Warfare Executive is formed to disseminate information to Germany and its Occupied countries.
- 9 August
  - Franklin D. Roosevelt and Winston Churchill meet on board ship at Naval Station Argentia, Newfoundland. The Atlantic Charter (released 14 August), setting goals for postwar international cooperation, is agreed as a result.
  - RAF pilot Douglas Bader taken prisoner by the Germans after a mid-air collision over France.
- 12 August – Dudley, which suffered 10 fatalities in a landmine attack in November last year, suffers five more fatalities when a second landmine is dropped in the town.
- 15 August – Josef Jakobs becomes the last person executed at the Tower of London when he faces execution by firing squad following conviction for an offence under the Treachery Act 1940.
- 16 August – HMS Mercury Royal Navy Signals School and Combined Signals School opens at Leydene, near Petersfield, Hampshire.
- 18 August – National Fire Service established.
- 30 August – first official 'Shetland bus' clandestine mission using Norwegian fishing boats between Shetland and German-occupied Norway.
- September
  - Air Raid Precautions is renamed the Civil Defence Service.
  - Local authorities are ordered to survey iron railings with the intention of their removal as scrap for munitions.
  - The Royal Scots Greys, stationed in the Middle East, receive their first tanks, being the last of the cavalry regiments of the British Army to have abandoned horses for combat operations.
- October – the first Ronald Searle cartoon to feature St Trinian's School is published, in the magazine Lilliput.
- 30 October – J. Arthur Rank purchases the Gaumont-British Picture Corporation, with its 251 cinemas and its subsidiary operations, Gainsborough Pictures and Lime Grove Studios.
- 31 October – a Huddersfield factory fire kills 49, many of them young women.
- End October – President of the United States Franklin D. Roosevelt approves US$1bn in Lend-Lease aid to Britain.
- 1 November – announcement that radical politician Sir Charles Trevelyan is donating his family home, Wallington Hall, Northumberland, to the National Trust, its first such stately home acquisition.
- 13 November – the aircraft carrier HMS Ark Royal is hit by the German submarine U-81 off Gibraltar; she capsizes and sinks under tow the next day.
- 27 November – Tobruk is relieved by the Eighth Army (which has controlled British and other Allied ground forces in the Western Desert from September) in Operation Crusader.
- 5 December – Britain declares war on Finland, Hungary and Romania.
- 8 December – the Battle of Hong Kong begins less than eight hours after the attack on Pearl Harbor when Imperial Japanese forces invade British Hong Kong. British Malaya is also attacked and there follows the declaration of war on Japan.
- 10 December – sinking of Prince of Wales and Repulse in the South China Sea: two Royal Navy capital ships, HMS Prince of Wales and HMS Repulse, are sunk by Japanese aircraft.
- 13 December
  - Battle of Cape Bon off Tunisia: two Italian cruisers are sunk without Allied losses.
  - Britain declares war on Bulgaria.
- 15 December – Crofter Hand Woven Harris Tweed Co Ltd v Veitch decided in the House of Lords upholds the right of trade unionists to strike as part of collective bargaining.
- 18 December – National Service (No. 2) Act comes into effect: All men and women aged 18–60 are now liable to some form of national service, including military service for men under 51 and unmarried women between 20 and 30. The first military registration of 18½-year-olds takes place. The schedule of reserved occupations is abandoned.
- 25 December
  - The Battle of Hong Kong ends after 17 days with surrender of the Crown colony of Hong Kong to the Japanese.
  - Sir Alan Brooke succeeds John Dill as Chief of the Imperial General Staff, an office he will hold until 1946.
- 27 December
  - Winston Churchill becomes the first British Prime Minister to address a Joint session of the U.S. Congress.
  - British Commandos raid the Norwegian port of Måløy on the island of Vågsøy, causing the Germans to reinforce the garrison and defenses.

=== Undated ===
- Spring – Noël Coward composes the song London Pride.
- The circular silver-alloy threepence coin is last minted for general circulation in the UK.
- Factory Canteen, predecessor of multinational foodservice company Compass Group, is founded in England by Jack Bateman.

== Publications ==
- Joyce Carey's memoir A House of Children, novel Herself Surprised and pamphlet The Case for African Freedom.
- Lord David Cecil's The English Poets, first of the 'Britain in Pictures' series.
- Agatha Christie's novels Evil Under the Sun (featuring Hercule Poirot) and N or M? (featuring Tommy and Tuppence working undercover in the war).
- A. J. Cronin's novel The Keys of the Kingdom.
- T. S. Eliot's poem The Dry Salvages, third of the Four Quartets (in February New English Weekly).
- Patrick Hamilton’s eve-of-war blackly comic novel Hangover Square.
- James Hilton's wartime novel Random Harvest.
- John Gillespie Magee, Jr.'s wartime sonnet "High Flight".
- The Oxford Dictionary of Quotations.
- John Pudney's wartime poem "For Johnny".
- Hilary St George Saunders' official booklet The Battle of Britain, August–October 1940.
- Rebecca West's Balkan travelogue Black Lamb and Grey Falcon.

== Births ==
- 1 January – Martin Evans, biologist
- 2 January – Celia Birtwell, textile and fashion designer
- 5 January – Kevin Keelan, English football goalkeeper, born in British India
- 7 January
  - Iona Brown, British violinist and conductor (died 2004)
  - John E. Walker, English chemist, Nobel Prize laureate
- 8 January – Graham Chapman, English comedy writer-performer (died 1989)
- 9 January – Terry Hands, English theatre director (died 2020)
- 10 January – Tom Clarke, Scottish politician
- 12 January – Long John Baldry, blues singer (died 2005)
- 19 January
  - Tony Anholt, actor (died 2002)
  - Colin Gunton, theologian (died 2003)
- 20 January – Allan Young, English footballer (died 2009)
- 27 January – Beatrice Tinsley, English-born astronomer (died 1981)
- 28 January – Ann Leslie, English journalist, born in British India (died 2023)
- 5 February – Gareth Williams, Baron Williams of Mostyn, Labour politician, Leader of the House of Lords, Lord President of the Council (died 2003)
- 7 February – Kevin Crossley-Holland, English author and poet
- 10 February – Michael Apted, English film director (died 2021)
- 17 February – Julia McKenzie, actress
- 20 February – Richard Mabey, English writer and broadcaster
- 25 February – David Puttnam, English film producer and life peer
- 26 February – Tony Ray-Jones, British photographer (died 1972)
- 27 February – Paddy Ashdown, Liberal Democrat politician, born in the British Raj (died 2018)
- 28 February – Tristan Garel-Jones, Welsh-born Conservative politician (died 2020)
- 4 March – Adrian Lyne, English film director
- 5 March – Errol Le Cain, children's book illustrator and animator (died 1989)
- 25 March
  - Lindy Hamilton-Temple-Blackwood, Marchioness of Dufferin and Ava, artist, conservationist and businesswoman (died 2020)
  - Rose Dugdale. heiress and IRA militant (died 2024)
- 26 March – Richard Dawkins, Kenyan-born British scientist
- 28 March – Jack Simmons, English cricketer
- 30 March – Graeme Edge, rock drummer and songwriter (The Moody Blues) (died 2021)
- 5 April – Dave Swarbrick, folk rock fiddle player (died 2016)
- 7 April
  - Peter Fluck, caricaturist (died 2026)
  - Gorden Kaye, comic actor (died 2017)
- 8 April – Vivienne Westwood, fashion designer (died 2022)
- 10 April – John Kurila, Scottish footballer (died 2018)
- 11 April – Shirley Stelfox, English actress (died 2015)
- 12 April – Bobby Moore, English football player and World Cup winning captain (died 1993)
- 13 April – Margaret Price, Welsh soprano (died 2011)
- 23 April – Ed Stewart, English disc jockey (died 2016)
- 26 April – Robin Jacob, English academic and judge
- 3 May – Paul Ferris, film composer and actor (died 1995)
- 10 May – Chris Denning, English radio presenter and convicted sex offender (died 2022)
- 11 May
  - Eric Burdon, singer-songwriter
  - Graham Miles, snooker player (died 2014)
- 13 May – Miles Kington, journalist and humorist (died 2008)
- 18 May – Miriam Margolyes, character actress
- 19 May – Igor Judge, Baron Judge, lord chief justice (died 2023)
- 21 May – Martin Carthy, English folk singer and guitarist
- 22 May – Menzies Campbell, politician (died 2025)
- 26 May – Ron Wallwork, English race walker
- 27 May – Derek Robinson, physicist (died 2002)
- 29 May – Doug Scott, English mountaineer (died 2020)
- 2 June – Charlie Watts, English rock drummer (died 2021)
- 5 June – Jeff Rooker, Baron Rooker, English academic and politician, Minister of State for Immigration
- 7 June – Lady Elizabeth Shakerley, English party planner, socialite and first cousin once removed of Queen Elizabeth II (died 2020)
- 8 June – Robert Bradford, Northern Irish footballer and politician (assassinated 1981)
- 9 June – Jon Lord, composer, pianist and organist (died 2012)
- 14 June
  - Roy Harper, folk rock singer-guitarist
  - Mike Yarwood, impressionist and comedian (died 2023)
- 18 June – Delia Smith, cook
- 20 June – Stephen Frears, film and television director
- 25 June – Eddie Large, born Edward McGinnis, Scottish-born comedian (died 2020)
- 27 June
  - Ian Black, swimmer
  - James P. Hogan, author (died 2010)
- 7 July
  - Christopher Beeny, English actor (died 2020)
  - Alan Durban, Welsh international footballer, manager
  - Michael Howard, Welsh politician
  - Bill Oddie, English comedy writer-performer, songwriter and birder (died 2026)
  - Jim Rodford, English rock bassist (died 2018)
- 8 July – Polly James, actress
- 10 July – Jackie Lane, actress (died 2021)
- 11 July – Tommy Vance, disc jockey (died 2005)
- 18 July – Duncan Worsley, cricketer
- 29 July – David Warner, actor (died 2022)
- 4 August – Martin Jarvis, actor
- 6 August – Andrew Green, Baron Green of Deddington, diplomat
- 16 August – David Dickinson, British antiques expert, television presenter
- 21 August – Howard Lew Lewis, English comedian, actor (died 2018)
- 22 August – Barry Jackson, English track and field athlete
- 26 August – Chris Curtis, drummer (The Searchers) (died 2005)
- 29 August – Robin Leach, television personality (died 2018)
- 30 August – Sue MacGregor, radio broadcaster
- 6 September – Roger Law, caricaturist
- 10 September – Christopher Hogwood, English conductor (died 2014)
- 17 September – Marit Allen, film costume designer (died 2007)
- 22 September – Tom Conti, actor
- 26 September – Martine Beswick, actress and model
- 27 September – Peter Bonetti, England football goalkeeper (died 2020)
- 28 September – Mike Osborne, jazz musician (died 2007)
- 29 September – Fred West, English serial killer (suicide 1995)
- 30 September – Angela Pleasence, actress
- 4 October – Jackie Collins, English-born novelist (died 2015)
- 5 October
  - Stephanie Cole, English actress (died 2026)
  - Steven Spurrier, wine merchant and writer (died 2021)
- 12 October – Michael Mansfield, barrister
- 19 October – Peter Thornley, English professional wrestler best known for the ring character Kendo Nagasaki
- 20 October – Anneke Wills, actress
- 21 October – Dickie Pride, rock and roll singer (died 1969)
- 23 October – Greg Ridley, rock bassist (died 2003)
- 28 October
  - John Hallam, English actor (died 2006)
  - Hank Marvin, born Brian Rankin, English guitarist
- 29 October – George Davies, English fashion retailer
- 30 October – Bob Wilson, football player and broadcaster
- 31 October – Joy Grieveson, British sprinter
- 1 November – Nigel Dempster, columnist (died 2007)
- 2 November – Bruce Welch, born Bruce Cripps, English guitarist
- 6 November – James Bowman, countertenor (died 2023)
- 10 November – Graham Clark, operatic tenor (died 2023)
- 18 November
  - David Hemmings, English actor (died 2003)
  - Angela Watkinson, educator and politician
- 24 November – Pete Best, English drummer
- 1 December – Nigel Rodley, English international human rights lawyer (died 2017)
- 5 December – Sheridan Morley, theatre critic (died 2007)
- 7 December – Val Wilmer, photographer and writer
- 8 December – Geoff Hurst, footballer
- 17 December – Alan Sinfield, English academic (died 2017)
- 18 December – Prince William of Gloucester (died 1972)
- 22 December – M. Stanley Whittingham, English-born solid-state chemist, winner of the Nobel Prize in Chemistry.
- 24 December
  - Michael Billington, English actor (died 2005)
  - John Levene, British actor
- 25 December – Kenneth Calman, Scottish physician and academic (died 2025)
- 31 December
  - Alex Ferguson, Scottish footballer and football manager
  - Sarah Miles, actress

== Deaths ==
- 5 January – Amy Johnson, aviator (born 1903; aviation accident)
- 8 January – Lord Robert Baden-Powell, soldier and founder of the Boy Scouts (born 1857)
- 10 January – Frank Bridge, composer (born 1879)
- 24 January – Josslyn Hay, 22nd Earl of Erroll (born 1901; murder)
- 4 February – George Lloyd, 1st Baron Lloyd, politician and diplomat (born 1879)
- 12 February – Charles Voysey, Arts and Crafts designer and domestic architect (born 1857)
- 8 March – Ken "Snakehips" Johnson, jazz musician and dancer (born 1914 in British Guiana; enemy action)
- 11 March – Sir Walford Davies, composer (Royal Air Force March Past) (born 1869)
- 13 March – Tom Mann, trade unionist (born 1856)
- 28 March – Virginia Woolf, novelist (born 1882; suicide)
- 5 April – Sir Nigel Gresley, railway steam locomotive designer (Flying Scotsman and Mallard) (born 1876)
- 16 April – Josiah Stamp, 1st Baron Stamp, economist (born 1880; enemy action)
- 17 April – Al Bowlly, big band singer (born 1898 in Mozambique; enemy action)
- 23 May – Herbert Austin, 1st Baron Austin, car designer and manufacturer (born 1866)
- 24 May – Lancelot Holland, admiral (born 1887; died in action)
- 30 May – Prajadhipok, deposed king of Siam (born 1893)
- 1 June – Sir Hugh Walpole, New Zealand-born novelist (born 1884)
- 15 June – Evelyn Underhill, Christian mystic (born 1875)
- 30 June – Charles Cripps, 1st Baron Parmoor, lawyer and politician (born 1852)
- 11 July – Sir Arthur Evans, archaeologist (born 1851)
- 12 August – Freeman Freeman-Thomas, 1st Marquess of Willingdon, politician and colonial administrator, 22nd Viceroy of India, 13th Governor General of Canada (born 1866)
- 20 August – John Baird, 1st Viscount Stonehaven, politician, 8th Governor-General of Australia (born 1874)
- 17 September – Fred Karno, music hall impresario (born 1866)
- 13 October – David Devant, stage magician (born 1868)
- 7 November – Frank Pick, transport administrator and patron of industrial design (born 1878)
- 16 November – Sir Henry Wilson, general (born 1859)
- 27 November – Sir Charles Briggs, general (born 1865)
- 10 December – Sir Tom Phillips, admiral (born 1888; killed in action)

== See also ==
- List of British films of 1941
- Military history of the United Kingdom during World War II
