= Bill Weston (stuntman) =

English actor and stuntman

- Weston in 2001: A Space Odyssey, 1968
- Born: 29 May 1941; England
- Died: 25 March 2012 (aged 70); England
- Occupations: Actor, stuntman
- Spouse: Judy Weston

Bill Weston (29 May 1941 – 25 March 2012) was an English actor and stuntman.

== Life and career ==
Weston was born in England on 29 May 1941. He began his screen career in 1966, where he stunt doubled for Gordon Jackson in the film The Fighting Prince of Donegal. He stunt doubled for actors David Warner, Peter O'Toole and Michael York.

Later in his career, in 1968, Weston played an astronaut and stunt doubled for Keir Dullea in the film 2001: A Space Odyssey. He performed stunts in the television programs Doctor Who and The Benny Hill Show. He also performed stunts in numerous films such as Star Wars, Titanic, The Spy Who Loved Me, My Beautiful Laundrette, Superman, The Imaginarium of Doctor Parnassus, Saving Private Ryan, The Da Vinci Code, A Bridge Too Far, Robin Hood: Prince of Thieves, Lamb and The Oxford Murders. In 1987, he played agent Blayden Butler in the film The Living Daylights.

Weston retired from stunt performing in 2011, last appearing in the film Harry Potter and the Deathly Hallows – Part 2.

== Personal life and death ==
Weston was married to Judy. Their marriage lasted until Weston's death in 2012.

Weston died of cancer in England on 25 March 2012, at the age of 70.
