= News Chronicle =

British daily newspaper

- Type: Daily newspaper
- Owner: Cadbury family
- Founded: 2 June 1930
- Ceased publication: 17 October 1960
- Language: English
- City: London
- Country: United Kingdom
- Sister newspapers: The Star

The News Chronicle was a British daily newspaper. Formed by the merger of The Daily News and the Daily Chronicle in 1930, it ceased publication on 17 October 1960, being absorbed into the Daily Mail. Its offices were at 12/22, Bouverie Street, off Fleet Street, London, EC4Y 8DP, England.

== Daily Chronicle ==
The Daily Chronicle was founded in 1872. Purchased by Edward Lloyd for £30,000 in 1876, it achieved a high reputation under the editorship of Henry Massingham and Robert Donald, who took charge in 1904.

Owned by the Cadbury family, with Laurence Cadbury as chairman, the News Chronicle was formed by the merger of the Daily News and the Daily Chronicle on 2 June 1930, with Walter Layton appointed as editorial director.

The centenary of the Daily News (founded 1846) was marked by a BBC radio documentary called Reporting Progress. This was transmitted on the Home Service on 20th January 1946 and included dramatisations of historic events reported in the Daily News and News Chronicle. The programme exists in its entirety, having been recovered from St Bride Library in Fleet Street in 2015.

== Politics ==
With the outbreak of the Spanish Civil War, the paper took an anti-Franco stance and sent three correspondents to Spain in 1936-37: Denis Weaver, who was captured and nearly shot before being released; Arthur Koestler (to Málaga); and, later, Geoffrey Cox (to Madrid). The paper's editorial staff took an active part in campaigning for the release of Koestler, who was captured by Franco's forces at the fall of Málaga and was in imminent danger of being executed.

Following Koestler's release, the paper sent him to Mandatory Palestine, then convulsed by the Arab revolt. In a series of articles in the paper, Koestler urged adoption of the Peel Commission's recommendation for partition of Palestine, as "the only practical way of ending the bloodshed". In his autobiography Koestler notes that en route to Palestine he had stopped in Athens and had clandestine meetings with Communists and Liberals opposing the then Metaxas dictatorship, but the News Chronicle refused to publish his resulting strongly worded anti-Metaxas articles.

In 1956, the News Chronicle opposed the UK's military support of Israel in invading the Suez canal zone, a decision which cost it circulation. According to Geoffrey Goodman, a journalist on the newspaper at the time, it was "one of British journalism's prime casualties of the Suez crisis".

== Folding ==
On 17 October 1960, the News Chronicle "finally folded, inappropriately, into the grip" of the right-wing Daily Mail despite having a circulation of over a million. The News Chronicle's editorial position was considered at the time to be in broad support of the British Liberal Party, in marked contrast to that of the Daily Mail. As part of the same takeover, the London evening paper The Star was incorporated into the Evening News.

== Notable contributors ==
Notable contributors to the News Chronicle and its predecessors included:

- Stephen G. Barber - foreign correspondent, World War II, Greek Civil War, Korean War, Indochina, Cyprus Crisis, Sharpeville Massacre, decolonization in Africa. Also worked for The Daily Telegraph in India and Bureau Chief in Washington, D.C. 1963-1980
- Frank D. Barber - foreign correspondent, later Head of Central Current Affairs & Talks, BBC World Service, and father of Financial Times editor Lionel Barber
- Vernon Bartlett – diplomatic correspondent
- Ritchie Calder - science editor, who broke the story of the discovery of DNA structure in 1953
- James Cameron – war correspondent
- Mike Chaney – Also became editor of Today
- G.K. Chesterton – weekly opinion column in the Daily News
- Norman Clark - war correspondent; foreign editor
- Geoffrey Cox – war correspondent in the Spanish Civil War (in Madrid); former editor and chief executive of ITN. Began his career with the News Chronicle in 1932
- E. S. Dallas – Paris correspondent
- Sir Arthur Conan Doyle – war correspondent for the Daily Chronicle during World War I
- William ("Willie") Forrest - war correspondent in Spain and World War II; foreign correspondent
- Philip Jordan – war correspondent, World War II
- Tom Kettle – war correspondent for the Daily News during the early part of World War I
- Arthur Koestler – writer and war correspondent in the Spanish Civil War
- Joseph Lee - artist and poet who worked as a sub-editor for News Chronicle
- Patrick Maitland, (later MP for Lanark and Earl of Lauderdale) - war correspondent for News Chronicle, Pacific, 1941 to 1944
- Richard Moore - leader writer and father of journalist Charles Moore
- Louise Morgan - Irish-born, (1886-1964) educated in U.S.A., editor and journalist, writer of News Chronicle articles from 1933 to the early 1950s, and author of Inside Yourself: A New Way to Health Based on the Alexander Technique
- C.W.A. Scott - aviation editor
- John Segrue – foreign correspondent; twice expelled by the Nazis, he was eventually captured and interned in a German prisoner-of-war camp, where he died in 1942.
- Sir Patrick Sergeant - later Daily Mail City Editor, founder and owner of Euromoney
- David Esdaile Walker – war correspondent, chief leader writer 1955-1959
- H.G. Wells – contributor to the Daily News

== Editors ==
1930: Tom Clarke
1933: Aylmer Vallance
1936: Gerald Barry
1948: Robin Cruikshank
1954: Michael Curtis
1957: Norman Cursley

== See also ==
- Get Ahead: BBC TV programme broadcast from 1958 to 1962 which was sponsored by the paper.
- "Brief history of the Enterprise Class": The News Chronicle sponsored Jack Holt in 1955 to design the Enterprise (dinghy)
- The Cricket Annual: A cricket annual which for many years was published as the News Chronicle Cricket Annual.
