= Huddersfield factory fire =

1941 fire in Huddersfield, England

Coordinates: 53°38′59″N 1°47′00″W

The Huddersfield factory fire occurred on 31 October 1941 in the town of Huddersfield, West Yorkshire, England, inside the H Booth & Son factory. The fire was caused by a smoker's pipe left alight inside a raincoat pocket when work had just commenced. It destroyed the building and killed 49, most of them women and young girls. Many were left trapped in the upper floors of the five storey building as it did not have a fire escape.

In November 2012, a memorial was unveiled on the site to commemorate 71 years since the disaster.
