= Duncan Worsley =

English cricketer

Personal information
- Full name: Duncan Robert Worsley
- Born: 18 July 1941 (age 85); Farnworth, Bolton, Lancashire, England
- Batting: Left-handed
- Bowling: Right-arm off-spin

Domestic team information
- Years: Team
- 1960–67: Lancashire
- 1961–64: Oxford University

Career statistics
Competition	First-class	List A
Matches	113	3
Runs scored	5062	77
Batting average	26.09	25.66
100s/50s	4/25	0/0
Top score	139	39
Balls bowled	3422	–
Wickets	37	–
Bowling average	41.08	–
5 wickets in innings	0	–
10 wickets in match	0	–
Best bowling	4/21	–
Catches/stumpings	68/–	1/–
- Source: Cricinfo, 1 October 2014

Duncan Robert Worsley (born 18 July 1941) is a former cricketer who played first-class cricket for Lancashire and Oxford University from 1960 to 1967.

== Oxford career ==
Born in Bolton, Worsley attended Bolton School, where he captained the First XI in 1960, making 452 runs at an average of 32.28 and taking 58 wickets at 10.98, and leading the side through an unbeaten season with 14 victories. He made his first-class debut at the end of the season, opening the batting for Lancashire against the touring South Africans, and went up to St Edmund Hall, Oxford, shortly afterwards.

He played for Oxford as an opener for four seasons, and was secretary of the club in 1962, vice-captain in 1963, and captain in 1964. His first century came in the match against Middlesex in 1961, when he made 139 in five and a half hours and added 207 for the fourth wicket with the Nawab of Pataudi. In 1962, captaining the side temporarily, he made 114 against Free Foresters. Oxford needed 367 to win, Worsley and Murtuza Baig added 201 for the third wicket in 140 minutes, and the match finished with Oxford nine wickets down and the scores level.

Over four seasons he played 51 matches for Oxford, scoring 2554 runs at an average of 26.88.

== Lancashire career ==
After a gap of nearly four years Worsley resumed his county career with Lancashire immediately after Oxford's last match in 1964, opening against Surrey and scoring 73 in the first innings, adding 142 for the third wicket with his captain, Ken Grieves. Later in the season he had a run of 10 and 104 (top score) against Kent, 79 (top score) and 0 not out against Somerset, 4 and 61 (top score) against Nottinghamshire and 120 (top score) and 0 against Sussex. He finished the season with 1498 runs in all matches at 31.87 and was named as one of England's most promising young players by Wisden's editor, Norman Preston.

His form fell away in 1965, but in 1966 he moved down to the middle order, regained form with 843 runs at 29.06, and was awarded his county cap. John Kay remarked that Worsley "showed signs of becoming an increasingly valuable batsman who ... also bowled off-spinners with promise". He took 19 wickets at 32.10 that year. However, after a mediocre season in 1967 he retired to become a teacher.

He had a long career with several clubs in the Bolton Cricket League. He was the first player in the League to score 10,000 runs and take 1000 wickets.
