= Spellbound (1941 film) =

1941 British drama film directed by John Harlow

- Directed by: John Harlow
- Written by: Miles Malleson
- Based on: The Necromancers; 1909 novel by Robert Hugh Benson
- Produced by: R. Murray-Leslie
- Starring: Derek Farr; Vera Lindsay; Hay Petrie; Felix Aylmer; Frederick Leister
- Cinematography: Guy Green; Walter J. Harvey
- Edited by: Frederick Wilson
- Music by: Walter Goehr
- Production company: Pyramid Amalgamated
- Distributed by: Producers Releasing Corporation (U.S.)
- Release dates: 10 May 1941 (UK); 10 February 1945 (U.S.)
- Running time: 82 min
- Country: United Kingdom
- Language: English

Spellbound (also known as Passing Clouds; U.S. titles (1945 release): Ghost Story and The Spell of Amy Nugent) is a 1941 British second feature ('B') drama film directed by John Harlow and starring Derek Farr, Vera Lindsay and Hay Petrie. It was written by Miles Malleson based on the 1909 novel The Necromancers by Robert Hugh Benson.

== Premise ==
A young man is distraught after losing his fiancée to a terminal illness. He soon becomes involved with a group of spiritualists in order to contact her. This leads to a frightening series of events.

== Cast ==
- Derek Farr as Laurie Baxter
- Vera Lindsay as Diana Hilton
- Hay Petrie as Mr. Cathcart
- Felix Aylmer as Mr. Morton
- Frederick Leister as Mr. Vincent
- Marian Spencer as Mrs. Stapleton
- Diana King as Amy Nugent
- W.G. Fay as Johnnie
- Winifred Davis as Mrs. Baxter
- Enid Hewit as Lady Laura Bethel
- Gibb McLaughlin as Gibb
- Cameron Hall as Mr. Nugent
- Irene Handl as Mrs. Nugent
- Hannen Swaffer as himself

== Reception ==
The Monthly Film Bulletin wrote: "This film is made unusual only by its strong controversial aspect, on account of which it was at first banned by the censor. The ban was lifted at the request of Hannen Swaffer as President of the National Union of Spiritualists, who delivers a foreword to the film. ... Considered simply as entertainment, the film is a fair enough example of the thriller type. Interest is well maintained from the beginning, and excitement is successfully built up to the climax. Séances begin to the sound of spine-shivering music, and billowing curtains and a slammed door acquire a weird significance. ... Derek Farr gives a convincing impression of being in the grip of demoniac forces, while the performance of W. G. Fay as a whimsical Irish gardener will certainly be popular, and Hay Petrie as Cathcart, the theologian, almost steals the picture. This film is definitely unsuitable for children."

Kine Weekly wrote: "The acting is sincere, if at times, a little stilted, and so is the direction. ... Derek Farr acts intelligently as Laurie, but clever young actor that he is, the part frequently lacks conviction. Vera Lindsay also finds the going a little hard as Diana. The best performances ¢ome from Hay Petrie, as the theologian, Frederick Leister, as the medium, and Felix Aylmer, as the tutor. Many incidental scenes and situations are impressive, but when all is said, seen afd done, the play fails both as an indictment and as propaganda. Having seen it spiritualists will remain spiritualists and scoffers will continue to scoff. ... Hannen Swaffer, the famous journalist and columnist, contributes a neatly worded preface."

Picturegoer wrote: "The production is very interesting and John Harlow's direction develops the theme with full dramatic force."

Picture Show wrote: "Sincerely treated drama which has spiritualism as its theme, and turns on the question whether its tice can provoke madness. It is thrilling and full of suspense, but does not solve the problem. It is commendable that it neither champions nor condemns spiritualism, but treats this very controversial subject with impartiality – not even the question of a spirit 'materialising' is denied; such a 'materialisation " is shown.' Derek Farr and Tay Petrie are outstanding in their portrayal. It is well set and photographed."

In British Sound Films: The Studio Years 1928–1959 David Quinlan rated the film as "good", writing: "Interesting, dramatically strongly developed."
