= List of newspapers in the United Kingdom by circulation =

Newspapers have been widely distributed in the United Kingdom for hundreds of years. Sales rose during the 1800s and continued to do so until the middle of the 20th century, when they reached their peak circulation, however since then their readership has significantly declined. Today, the UK's most highly circulating paper is the free sheet Metro whilst other popular titles include tabloids such as The Sun and Daily Mirror, middle market papers such as the Daily Mail and Daily Express and broadsheet newspapers such as The Times, The Daily Telegraph, the Financial Times and The Guardian.

== History ==
Breakdown of UK daily newspaper circulation, 1956 to 2019

At the start of the 19th century, the highest-circulation newspaper in the United Kingdom was the Morning Post, which sold around 4,000 copies per day, twice the sales of its nearest rival. As production methods improved, print runs increased and newspapers were sold at lower prices. By 1828, the Morning Herald was selling the most copies, but it was soon overtaken by The Times.

Pubs would typically take in one or two papers for their customers to read, and through this method, by the 1850s the newspaper of the licensed trade, the Morning Advertiser, had the second highest circulation. Sales of The Times were around 40,000, and it had around 80% of the entire daily newspaper market, but Sunday papers were more popular, some boasting sales of more than 100,000. Later in the century, the Daily News came to prominence, selling 150,000 copies a day in the 1870s, while by 1890, The Daily Telegraph had a circulation of 300,000. Sunday newspaper sales also grew rapidly, with Lloyd's Weekly Newspaper being the first to sell one million copies an issue. The press was changed by the introduction of halfpenny papers. The first national halfpenny paper was the Daily Mail (followed by the Daily Express and the Daily Mirror), which became the first weekday paper to sell one million copies around 1911. Circulation continued to increase, reaching a peak in the mid-1950s; sales of the News of the World reached a peak of more than eight million in 1950.

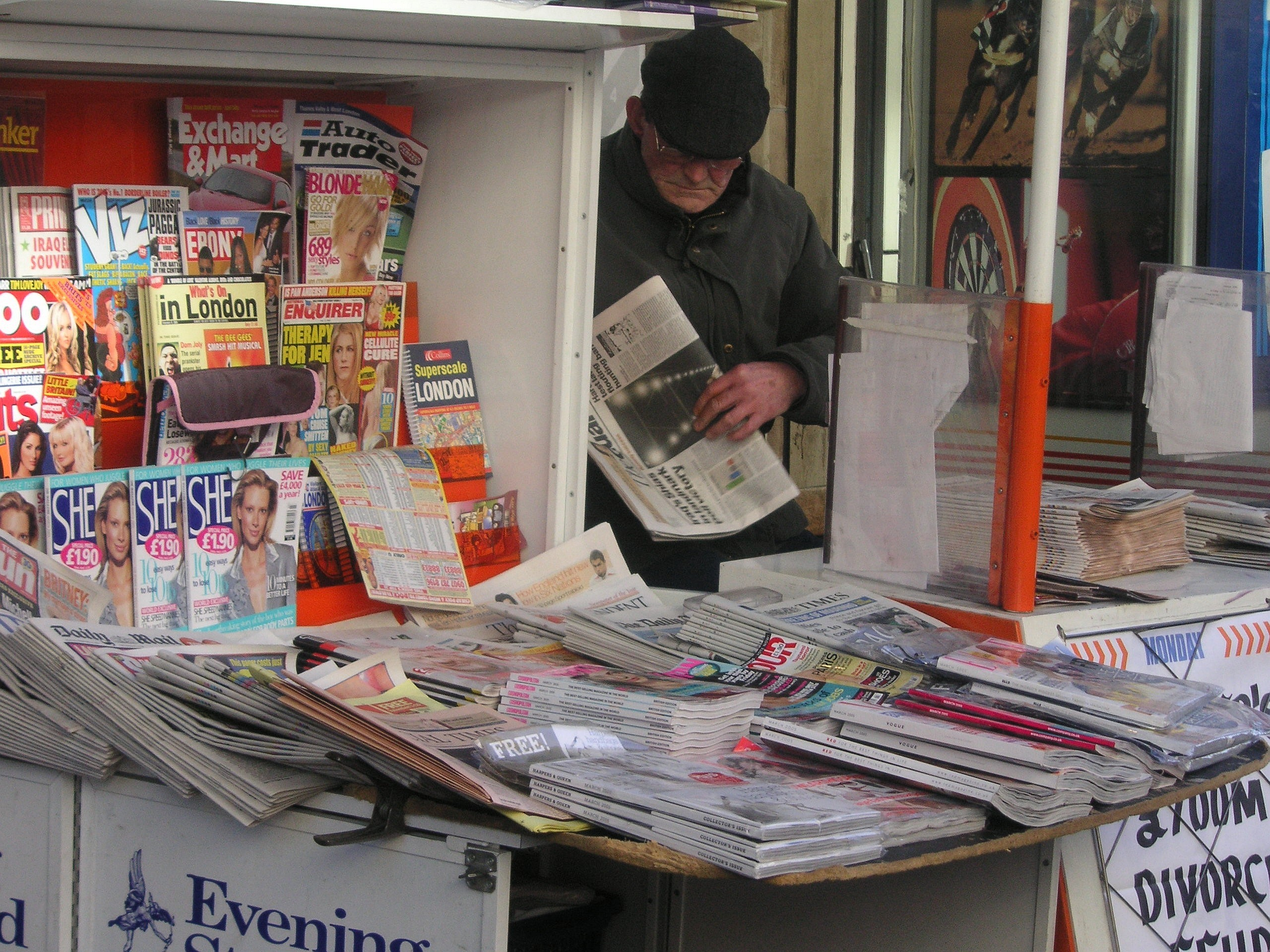
Newspaper vendor outside Paddington station, London (2005)

Since the 1950s, there has been a gradual decline in newspaper sales. The availability of multimedia news platforms has accelerated this decline in the 21st century, and by the close of 2014, no UK daily or Sunday newspaper had a circulation exceeding two million. The overall circulation of newspapers declined by 6.6% in 2014–15. In February 2018 The Sun's 40-year dominance at the top of the circulation charts was eclipsed by the free Metro newspaper for the first time. In May 2020 the Audit Bureau of Circulations, which records and audits sales, stated that monthly publication of circulation figures would no longer be automatic, as publishers were concerned that they had become a "negative narrative of decline". The first newspapers to decline to publish circulation figures were The Telegraph, The Sun and The Times.

== Daily newspapers ==
=== 2020 to present ===
Figures shown are average circulations for January of each year. Regardless of immediate source, all figures originate from the Audit Bureau of Circulations. In the 2020s, several newspapers stopped reporting circulation figures.

Title	2025	2024	2023	2022	2021	2020
Metro	N/A	N/A	953,475	1,027,989	597,979	1,426,535
Daily Mail	687,063	735,857	797,704	909,201	960,019	1,169,241
Evening Standard	N/A	N/A	314,285	446,257	489,405	798,168
Daily Mirror	205,332	240,799	277,550	333,731	366,501	451,466
Daily Express	128,551	152,699	176,264	221,214	238,230	296,079
Daily Star	111,082	132,979	157,612	195,545	220,126	277,237
i	122,487	126,308	134,277	142,598	141,115	217,182
Financial Times	109,995	115,118	114,685	113,817	97,067	157,982
City A.M.	68,053	N/A	67,090	76,465	N/A	85,521
Daily Record	44,207	52,978	61,883	75,696	85,769	104,343
The Guardian	N/A	N/A	N/A	N/A	108,687	132,341
The Sun	N/A	N/A	N/A	N/A	N/A	1,250,634
The Times	N/A	N/A	N/A	N/A	N/A	368,929
The Daily Telegraph	N/A	N/A	N/A	N/A	N/A	360,345

=== 2010–2019 ===
Figures shown are average circulations for January of each year. Regardless of immediate source, all figures originate from the Audit Bureau of Circulations.

Title	2019	2018	2017	2016	2015	2014	2013	2012	2011	2010
Metro	1,426,050	1,475,372	1,476,956	1,348,033	?	1,362,893	?	?	?	?
The Sun	1,410,896	1,545,594	1,666,715	1,787,096	1,978,702	2,213,659	2,409,811	2,582,301	3,001,822	3,006,565
Daily Mail	1,246,568	1,343,142	1,511,357	1,589,471	1,688,727	1,780,565	1,863,151	1,945,496	2,136,568	2,120,347
Evening Standard	864,620	888,017	887,253	898,407	877,532	805,309	695,645	699,368	704,008	601,960
Daily Mirror	508,705	583,192	724,888	809,147	922,235	992,256	1,058,488	1,102,810	1,194,097	1,218,425
The Times	417,298	440,558	451,261	404,155	396,621	384,304	399,339	397,549	457,250	508,250
The Daily Telegraph	360,345	385,346	472,258	472,033	494,675	544,546	555,817	578,774	651,184	691,128
Daily Star	329,971	391,998	443,452	470,369	425,246	489,067	535,957	617,082	734,311	779,376
Daily Express	321,146	364,721	392,526	408,700	457,914	500,473	529,648	577,543	639,875	674,640
i	233,868	257,223	266,768	271,859	280,351	298,266	293,946	264,432	133,472	N/A
Financial Times	180,053	189,579	188,924	198,237	219,444	234,193	275,375	316,493	383,067	390,315
The Guardian	141,160	152,714	156,756	164,163	185,429	207,958	204,440	215,988	279,308	302,285
Daily Record	119,328	134,087	155,772	176,892	203,725	227,639	251,535	291,825	306,872	323,831
City A.M.	85,982	90,569	90,319	97,259	?	?	?	?	?	?
The Independent	N/A	N/A	N/A	55,193	61,338	66,576	76,802	105,160	185,035	185,815

=== 2000–2009 ===
Figures shown are average circulations for January of each year. Only newspapers with circulations of more than 100,000 copies per day in January 2009 are listed. Regardless of immediate source, all figures originate from the Audit Bureau of Circulations.

Title	2009	2008	2007	2006	2005	2004	2003	2002	2001	2000
The Sun	3,146,006	3,209,766	3,217,844	3,319,337	3,382,509	3,410,701	3,578,506	3,502,923	3,636,561	3,557,336
Daily Mail	2,200,398	2,313,908	2,354,028	2,389,011	2,409,121	2,485,210	2,518,544	2,489,264	2,479,768	2,353,915
Daily Mirror	1,366,891	1,512,599	1,621,000	1,727,672	1,748,327	1,919,125	2,071,059	2,164,576	2,149,422	2,270,543
The Daily Telegraph	783,210	890,086	911,454	917,943	920,745	914,981	946,697	1,013,653	1,022,263	1,039,749
Daily Star	768,534	722,969	773,637	820,070	861,825	901,879	835,343	706,554	543,807	502,647
Daily Express	736,340	752,699	771,325	849,001	949,238	956,649	983,391	991,560	979,042	1,050,846
The Times	617,483	633,718	670,054	685,081	686,327	660,713	671,340	711,295	734,220	726,349
Financial Times	426,676	452,448	439,104	441,840	422,519	422,543	431,875	475,475	478,161	435,478
The Guardian	358,844	378,394	384,070	394,913	376,816	383,157	409,568	411,386	410,152	401,560
Daily Record	354,302	393,788	418,628	451,932	471,708	503,077	520,540	584,290	603,914	626,646
Evening Standard	237,403	294,823	276,562	337,080	350,671	395,090	424,177	410,104	432,661	440,287
The Independent	215,504	250,641	263,503	258,387	257,100	248,876	221,926	224,655	223,645	222,106

=== 1950–1999 ===
Figures shown are average circulations for each year. Figures originate from the Audit Bureau of Circulations.

Title	1997	1992	1987	1980	1976	1966	1961	1956
The Sun	3,877,097	3,570,562	3,993,000	3,741,000	3,708,000	1,238,000	N/A	N/A
Daily Mirror	2,442,078	2,900,000	3,123,000	3,625,000	3,851,000	5,123,000	4,561,000	4,649,696
Daily Mail	2,344,183	1,675,453	1,759,000	1,948,000	1,755,000	2,318,000	2,610,000	2,071,708
Daily Express	1,241,336	1,524,786	1,697,000	2,194,000	2,594,000	3,978,000	4,328,000	4,042,334
The Daily Telegraph	1,129,777	1,038,138	1,147,000	1,439,000	1,308,000	1,353,000	1,248,000	1,075,460
The Times	821,000	386,258	442,000	297,000	310,000	282,000	253,000	220,716
Daily Star	729,991	805,793	1,289,000	1,034,000	N/A	N/A	N/A	N/A
Daily Record	703,090	755,026		732,000				
The Guardian	428,010	429,062	494,000	377,000	306,000	281,000	245,000	163,585
Financial Times	326,516	290,204	280,000	197,000	174,000	152,000	132,000	80,518
The Independent	288,182	389,523	293,000	N/A	N/A	N/A	N/A	N/A
Today	N/A	533,177	350,000	N/A	N/A	N/A	N/A	N/A
Daily Herald	N/A	N/A	N/A	N/A	N/A	N/A	1,394,000	1,693,997
Daily Sketch	N/A	N/A	N/A	N/A	N/A	857,000	981,000	1,123,855
Daily Worker	N/A	N/A	N/A	N/A	N/A	N/A	60,000	
News Chronicle	N/A	N/A	N/A	N/A	N/A	N/A	N/A	1,442,438

=== Before 1950 ===
Figures shown are average circulations for each year. Figures from after 1931 originate from the Audit Bureau of Circulations;those from 1852 and 1838 originate from stamp duty returns. Those from 1910, 1921 and 1930 are the most uncertain and rely on information originating from T. B. Browne's Advertiser's ABC.

Title	1947	1939	1930	1921	1910	1863	1852	1838
Daily Express	3,855,000	2,546,000	1,693,000	579,000	400,000	N/A	N/A	N/A
Daily Mirror	3,702,000	1,571,000	1,071,000	1,003,000	630,000	N/A	N/A	N/A
Daily Herald	2,134,000	1,850,000	1,082,000	211,000	N/A	N/A	N/A	N/A
Daily Mail	2,076,000	1,533,000	1,845,000	1,533,000	900,000	N/A	N/A	N/A
News Chronicle	1,623,000	1,571,000	1,400,000	N/A	N/A	N/A	N/A	N/A
The Daily Telegraph	1,015,000	737,000	90,000	180,000	230,000	120,000	N/A	N/A
Daily Sketch	772,000	750,000	1,013,000	835,000	750,000	N/A	N/A	N/A
The Times	268,000	204,000	187,000	113,000	45,000	40,000	42,384	11,660
Manchester Guardian	126,000	51,000	47,000		40,000		3,173	
Daily Worker	118,000		N/A	N/A	N/A	N/A	N/A	N/A
Financial Times	71,000					N/A	N/A	N/A
Morning Advertiser	30,000					20,000	7,124	5,000
Daily Chronicle	N/A	N/A	N/A	661,000	800,000	N/A	N/A	N/A
Daily News	N/A	N/A	N/A	300,000		5,000	3,938	N/A
Morning Post	N/A	N/A	119,000		50,000		2,673	2,800
Morning Star	N/A	N/A	N/A	N/A	N/A	20,000	N/A	N/A
Morning Herald	N/A	N/A	N/A	N/A	N/A	2,000	4,112	6,150
North British Daily Advertiser	N/A	N/A	N/A	N/A	N/A		2,458	
Morning Chronicle	N/A	N/A	N/A	N/A	N/A	N/A	2,283	6,630

== Sunday newspapers ==
=== 2020 to present ===
Figures shown are average circulations for January of each year. Only newspapers with circulations of more than 50,000 copies in January 2020 are listed. Regardless of immediate source, all figures originate from the Audit Bureau of Circulations. In the 2020s, several newspapers stopped reporting circulation figures.

Title	2022	2021	2020
The Mail on Sunday	783,656	853,521	967,043
Sunday Mirror	265,771	305,444	367,244
Sunday Express	191,062	213,256	252,733
Daily Star Sunday	110,133	136,574	162,345
The Sunday People	98,107	118,233	139,698
Sunday Mail	74,865	88,819	105,451
Sunday Post	56,041	67,530	86,953
The Observer	N/A	143,764	156,217
The Sun on Sunday	N/A	N/A	1,042,193
The Sunday Times	N/A	N/A	645,108
The Sunday Telegraph	N/A	N/A	278,558

=== 2010–2019 ===
Figures shown are average circulations for January of each year. Only newspapers with circulations of more than 100,000 copies in January 2010 are listed. Regardless of immediate source, all figures originate from the Audit Bureau of Circulations.

Title	2019	2018	2017	2016	2015	2014	2013	2012	2011	2010
The Sun on Sunday	1,178,687	1,286,859	1,375,539	1,487,301	1,582,359	1,800,830	2,010,826	N/A	N/A	N/A
The Mail on Sunday	1,032,870	1,106,067	1,257,984	1,388,059	1,461,571	1,586,979	1,715,707	1,882,469	1,958,083	2,048,008
The Sunday Times	712,291	739,845	792,324	770,370	801,623	817,642	885,612	939,395	1,039,371	1,144,929
Sunday Mirror	431,419	506,866	629,277	749,061	877,910	948,754	1,039,150	1,594,293	1,092,816	1,124,620
Sunday Express	280,684	309,958	335,772	369,666	397,601	430,601	471,625	567,800	550,269	585,023
The Sunday Telegraph	278,558	298,720	359,400	355,044	381,347	429,285	435,036	461,280	527,742	602,306
Daily Star Sunday	201,969	236,631	256,801	299,146	265,382	310,063	345,885	599,078	316,712	358,814
The Observer	163,694	176,795	185,752	183,210	198,368	225,474	225,194	253,022	314,164	354,565
The Sunday People	159,836	193,839	240,846	279,837	335,093	374,820	429,167	701,246	500,866	532,975
Sunday Mail	123,755	140,743	168,164	195,167	222,879	256,052	283,861	376,898	366,325	395,126
Sunday Post	107,336	123,393	143,169	163,037	187,260	TBA	242,555	291,623	317,896	337,398
Independent on Sunday	N/A	N/A	N/A	91,644	97,646	101,284	114,308	124,428	152,561	153,975
News of the World	N/A	N/A	N/A	N/A	N/A	N/A	N/A	N/A	2,789,560	2,984,469

=== 2000–2009 ===
Figures shown are average circulations for January of each year. Only newspapers with circulations of more than 100,000 copies in January 2009 are listed. Regardless of immediate source, all figures originate from the Audit Bureau of Circulations.

Title	2009	2008	2007	2006	2005	2004	2003	2002	2001	2000
News of the World	3,031,025	3,264,676	3,426,719	3,789,176	3,823,317	3,845,373	3,971,998	4,086,621	4,026,288	4,139,793
The Mail on Sunday	2,134,809	2,330,366	2,303,472	2,404,511	2,446,465	2,364,156	2,388,416	2,342,860	2,373,007	2,323,720
Sunday Mirror	1,244,007	1,366,922	1,460,928	1,574,054	1,652,375	1,674,454	1,724,940	1,845,860	1,831,572	2,008,961
The Sunday Times	1,198,984	1,231,374	1,288,421	1,375,153	1,375,982	1,370,051	1,410,539	1,405,430	1,416,080	1,373,900
Sunday Express	646,971	704,436	790,068	877,101	976,055	930,001	976,346	834,999	879,622	974,310
The Sunday Telegraph	633,639	659,841	682,739	692,107	695,522	751,038	784,069	796,840	822,931	
The People	594,552	669,362	761,595	895,275	1,001,389	1,055,810	1,189,812	1,389,778	1,489,260	1,613,113
Daily Star Sunday	359,533	382,288	378,224	439,067	459,933	556,743	510,995	N/A	N/A	N/A
Sunday Mail	442,103	487,975	514,287	547,405	585,657	605,743	628,742	692,366	708,484	751,084
The Observer	427,867	444,951	444,186	542,075	446,818	459,804	465,984	449,806	440,090	416,460
Sunday Post	366,275	412,037	437,224	451,530	481,767	514,181	547,256	581,218	612,562	655,634
Independent on Sunday	178,798	236,500	247,829	241,414	206,527	206,087	220,028	231,869	250,462	248,630
Sunday Business	N/A	N/A	N/A	N/A	204,910	306,683	N/A	N/A	N/A	N/A

=== 20th century ===
Figures shown are average circulations for each year. Figures originate from the Audit Bureau of Circulations.

Title	1997	1987	1980	1976	1966	1961	1956	1947	1935
News of the World	4,620,415	5,360,000	4,335,000	5,138,000	6,152,000	6,643,000	7,493,463	7,890,000	3,350,000
Sunday Mirror	2,424,000	2,953,000	3,831,000	4,101,000	5,219,000	5,306,000	5,624,010	4,006,000	2,250,000
The Mail on Sunday	2,322,423	1,919,000	N/A	N/A	N/A	N/A	N/A	N/A	N/A
The People	2,001,978	2,743,000	3,847,000	4,094,000	5,560,000	5,450,000	4,948,215	4,670,000	3,000,000
The Sunday Times	1,449,113	1,314,000	1,424,000	1,382,000	1,363,000	967,000	618,540	568,000	215,000
Sunday Express	1,261,690	2,033,000	3,045,000	3,451,000	4,181,000	4,457,000	3,331,127	2,577,000	1,096,000
The Sunday Telegraph	983,253	693,000	1,017,000	759,000	650,000	688,000	N/A	N/A	N/A
Sunday Mail	818,081		734,617					567,728	250,000
Sunday Post	791,100		1,000,000						312,000
The Observer	498,086	722,000	973,000	670,000	881,000	715,000	601,042	384,000	215,000
Independent on Sunday	311,321	N/A	N/A	N/A	N/A	N/A	N/A	N/A	N/A
Scotland on Sunday	113,516	N/A	N/A	N/A	N/A	N/A	N/A	N/A	N/A
Reynolds News	N/A	N/A	N/A	N/A	216,000	310,000	516,445	720,000	400,000
Sunday Dispatch	N/A	N/A	N/A	N/A	N/A	N/A	2,420,159	2,061,000	936,000
Sunday Graphic	N/A	N/A	N/A	N/A	N/A	N/A	2,420,159	1,185,000	900,000
Empire News	N/A	N/A	N/A	N/A	N/A	N/A	2,550,308	2,033,177	1,535,000
Sunday Chronicle	N/A	N/A	N/A	N/A	N/A	N/A	N/A	1,178,000	830,000
Sunday Referee	N/A	N/A	N/A	N/A	N/A	N/A	N/A	N/A	215,000

=== 19th century ===
Figures shown are average circulations for each year. Figures originate from stamp duty returns.

Title	1863	1853	1838
Lloyd's Weekly Newspaper	500,000	N/A	N/A
Weekly Times	200,000	65,420	N/A
News of the World	150,000	69,296	N/A
Reynold's Weekly	100,000	30,035	N/A
Illustrated London News		82,331	N/A
Weekly Dispatch		35,420	51,570
Bell's Life in London		27,200	20,000
Sunday Times		8,500	13,365
Weekly Chronicle	N/A	N/A	32,327
Bell's Weekly Messenger	N/A	N/A	17,274

== Regional newspapers ==
Figures shown are average circulations for each year. Figures originate from the Audit Bureau of Circulations.

Title	2020	2016	2011	2006	1994	1980	1956	1948	1945	1939
Press and Journal (Aberdeen)	30,330	51,880	71,044	83,947	106,960	113,038				
The Courier (Dundee)	23,889	39,324	61,981	77,428	108,223	135,566				
Manchester Evening News	20,993	46,738	90,973	118,913	214,000	331,000			250,000	
Liverpool Echo	20,158	43,836	85,463	121,517	173,000	236,000			284,000	
Express & Star (Wolverhampton)	17,973	54,890	113,174	158,130	217,000				149,000	
Eastern Daily Press (Norfolk)	17,585	34,438	42,632	68,504						
The Herald (Glasgow)	28,872	N/A			113,342	116,161				
Hull Daily Mail	11,621	27,054	43,523	63,486	94,000				95,000	
The Sentinel (Staffordshire)	13,095	26,657	50,792	69,558	99,000				72,000	
Newcastle Chronicle	11,992	26,578	52,486	86,287	121,000				190,000	
Shropshire Star	12,883	26,332	55,606	55,529	97,000		N/A	N/A	N/A	N/A
Leicester Mercury	10,197	25,859	51,150	77,344	122,000				100,000	
Evening Express (Aberdeen)	12,623	25,744	47,849	56,582	70,000	81,950		114,700	67,000	104,322
Yorkshire Post	13,284	25,178	39,698	53,881	79,094			151,524		79,912
The Northern Echo (Darlington)	23,971	N/A	41,181	55,404	77,425					
Glasgow Evening Times	23,696	N/A	52,400	87,399	148,000	211,229		295,515	293,000	
North Wales Daily Post	21,802	N/A	31,802	39,651	N/A	N/A	N/A	N/A	N/A	N/A
South Wales Evening Post (Swansea)	9,563	21,031	40,149	56,104	70,000				47,000	
Teesside Gazette	9,104	20,973	40,546	56,384	70,000				69,000	
The News (Portsmouth)	9,109	19,797	41,442	65,000	80,000				81,000	
Birmingham Mail	8,628	19,200	47,217	78,178	200,000			296,259	200,000	
Derby Telegraph	9,745	18,903	32,356	47,406	67,000				46,000	
Echo (Southend)	18,373	N/A	30,108	37,887	55,000		N/A	N/A	N/A	N/A
Edinburgh Evening News	18,362	N/A	39,947	59,644	92,000	113,346			129,000	
Nottingham Post	7,088	17,524	35,361	65,623	113,000				90,000	
Bristol Post	6,331	17,381	38,344	56,220	93,000	110,000			109,000	
The Star (Sheffield)	7,968	16,708	37,255	64,466	105,000				156,000	
Southern Daily Echo (Southampton)	8,443	16,369	31,964	42,436	64,000				60,000	
The Herald (Plymouth)	7,234	16,350	29,709	40,384	58,000				62,000	
Yorkshire Evening Post	5,274	16,018	36,512	62,747	114,000			250,877	204,000	185,519
Coventry Telegraph	6,183	14,970	34,359	53,210	85,000				50,000	
South Wales Echo (Cardiff)	7,573	14,917	32,754	53,780	82,000				132,000	
The Press (York)	7,267	14,608	25,989	36,781	50,000				44,000	
Telegraph & Argus (Bradford)	13,951	N/A	26,766	40,440	63,000				103,000	
Bournemouth Daily Echo	7,542	13,579	26,818	34,324	50,000				45,000	
Sunderland Echo	12,825	N/A	32,771	45,247	62,000				57,000	
The Argus (Brighton)	7,531	11,079	29,949	34,287	68,000				42,000	
Lancashire Evening Post	4,903	10,751	23,183	36,028	68,000				88,000	
Bolton News	9,607	N/A	21,940	32,575	46,000				65,000	
Evening Standard (London)	N/A						662,608	780,820		384,419
Liverpool Post	N/A	N/A	8,217	17,858				382,169		236,986
Evening News (London)	N/A	N/A	N/A	N/A	N/A		1,121,195	1,652,646		837,638
The Star (London)	N/A	N/A	N/A	N/A	N/A	N/A	926,884	1,081,812		488,419
Manchester Evening Chronicle	N/A	N/A	N/A	N/A	N/A	N/A			224,000	
Glasgow Evening Citizen	N/A	N/A	N/A	N/A	N/A	N/A			144,000	
Birmingham Evening Despatch	N/A	N/A	N/A	N/A	N/A	N/A			138,000	
Yorkshire Evening News	N/A	N/A	N/A	N/A	N/A	N/A			122,000	
Glasgow Evening News	N/A	N/A	N/A	N/A	N/A	N/A			99,000	
Liverpool Evening Express	N/A	N/A	N/A	N/A	N/A	N/A			89,000	
The Belfast Telegraph	N/A	40,042	59,319							
The Irish News	27,730	35,073	43,647							
The News Letter	8,958	15,475	23,492							

== See also ==
- List of newspapers in the United Kingdom
- List of newspapers in the world by circulation
