= Kettledrum (horse) =

British-bred Thoroughbred racehorse

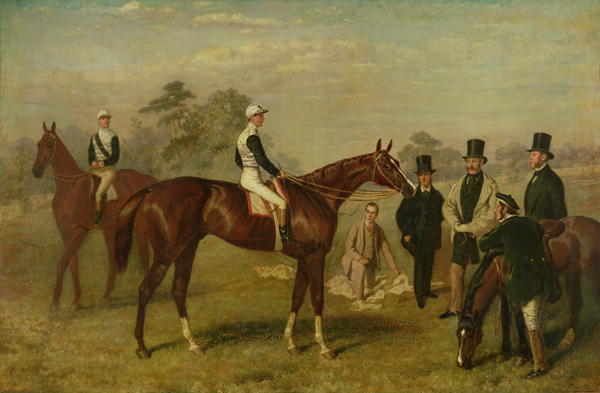
- Painting of Kettledrum by Harry Hall
- Sire: Rataplan
- Grandsire: The Baron
- Dam: Hybla
- Damsire: The Provost
- Sex: Stallion
- Foaled: 1858
- Died: 1885 (aged 26–27)
- Country: United Kingdom of Great Britain and Ireland
- Colour: Chestnut
- Breeder: James Cookson
- Owner: Charles Towneley
- Trainer: George Oates
- Record: 8: 4-2-0
- Earnings: £

Major wins
- Epsom Derby (1861); Doncaster Cup (1861)

Honours
- Kettledrum Inn, near Burnley, named in his honour.

Kettledrum (1858–1885) was a British Thoroughbred racehorse and sire. In a career that lasted from August 1860 to September 1861 he ran eight times and won four races. As a three-year-old in 1861, he won The Derby and the Doncaster Cup and finished second in the 2000 Guineas and the St Leger. At the end of the season he was retired to stud where he had limited success, and was later exported to Austria-Hungary.

== Background ==
Kettledrum was a big, powerful chestnut horse bred at Croft-on-Tees by James Cookson. As a yearling he was put up for sale at Doncaster and was bought for 400 guineas by the trainer George Oates on behalf of his patron, Charles Towneley of Towneley Hall in Burnley, Lancashire.

Kettledrum’s sire, Rataplan, was a top-class racehorse who won forty-two races including the Doncaster Cup and the Cambridgeshire Handicap. He was a successful stallion but was even more successful as a sire of broodmares, being the damsire of the Derby winners Cremorne and Kisber. Kettledrum’s dam, Hybla, was an excellent broodmare who had already produced the 1854 Epsom Oaks winner Mincemeat.

== Racing career ==
=== 1860: two-year-old season ===
Kettledrum made his debut in a race at York in August which he won despite not being fully fit. He was unsuccessful when running again at the same meeting.

In September he ran behind Walloon in the Champagne Stakes at Doncaster. He had done enough, however, to establish himself as a contender for the following year's Classics, being offered by bookmakers at odds of 8/1 for the 2000 Guineas and 20/1 for the Derby.

=== 1861: three-year-old season ===
Kettledrum took time to reach full fitness in the spring of 1861 and suffered from dental problems which affected his training. On his seasonal debut he ran in the South of England for the first time in the 2000 Guineas at Newmarket. He started 4/1 second favourite and finished second of the sixteen runners behind Diophantus. Kettledrum was beaten three lengths but appeared slightly unlucky in running as his rider, James Snowden had been unable to find space for a clear run at a crucial stage.

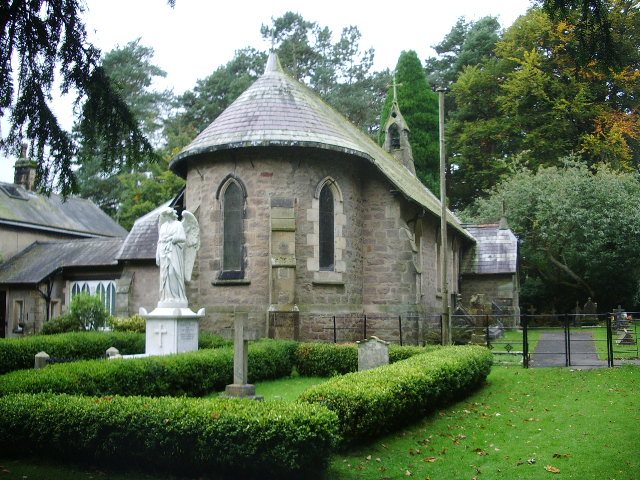
The St Hubert's Church building at Dunsop Bridge was financed by Charles Towneley from Kettledrum's Derby winnings.

Oates continued to supervise Kettledrum’s training, but moved the colt to a base in Lambourn to complete his preparation for the Derby. At Epsom on Wednesday, 29 May 1861 he started at odds of 12/1 in a field of eighteen runners, with Dundee starting the 3/1 favourite. There was much criticism of the state of the Epsom course, which had been badly neglected and was strewn with rubbish. The race was marred by a faulty start which saw several runners left at the start. Ridden by Ralph Bullock, Kettledrum was always prominent and moved up to take the lead from Diophantus in the straight. He was strongly challenged by Dundee on the wide outside and the two colts raced almost level into the final furlong. At this point the favourite faltered, having sustained an injury to his foreleg and Kettledrum was able to win comfortably by a length. Towneley reportedly used his winnings to pay for the building of a new Catholic Church at Dunsop Bridge, Lancashire.

Kettledrum did not race again until September 18 when he started 11/8 favourite for the St Leger at Doncaster. He did not help his own chances by misbehaving before the race and causing several false starts. In the race he ran in second place in the early stages before going to the front before half way and leading the field into the straight. Most of the opposition dropped away, but the filly Caller Ou, an unconsidered 66/1 outsider, emerged as a challenger. The two horses drew away from the field and raced together throughout the closing stages before the filly gained the advantage and won by a head. Two days later Kettledrum reappeared in the Doncaster Cup over two and a half miles. He took the lead in the straight and after an "exciting set-to" he ran a dead heat with The Oaks winner Brown Duchess, to whom he was conceding ten pounds. Brown Duchess's connections declined to take part in a deciding run-off, enabling Kettledrum to walk over for the prize money. He was allowed to walk over again in the Select Stakes at Newmarket in October and was then retired to stud.

== Stud career ==
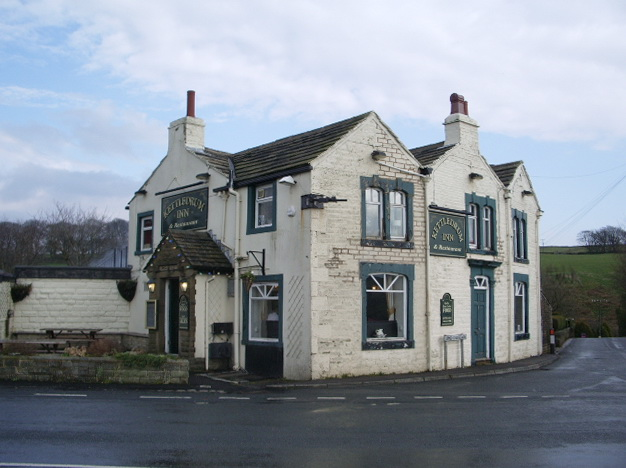
Kettledrum Inn in Mereclough named after the Derby winner

Kettledrum was not a great success as a stallion. His most significant offspring was Lady Langden, who produced the Champion sire Hampton. He is therefore an ancestor of the American champion Man o' War. Kettledrum was put up for sale along with the rest of Towneley's horses in 1870. In 1872 he was sold again, this time for 4000 guineas to Count Forgach and exported in to stand in Hungary where his last known foals were conceived in 1881. Kettledrum died in 1885 at the Count's stud at Nagy Szalancz.

== Honours ==
In the year of Kettledrum's Derby win a public house at Mereclough, in the parish of Cliviger near Burnley, was renamed The Kettledrum Inn in his honour. There is some speculation that the winnings from Kettledrum's Derby win paid for the pub, but there is evidence of an inn and alehouse having been on the site since the 1820s. It may be the case that the winnings paid for a refit or extension, but nothing more. The pub survives to the present day and is widely recognised as one of the best country pubs in the area (September 2014).

Shortly after the pub was refurbished in early 2014, a couple visiting the UK from Australia donated an unusual memento to the owners in the shape of a silver-mounted ink-well fashioned from a horse's hoof. They claimed that the hoof was actually taken from Kettledrum after his death, and the underside of this somewhat grisly item does indeed have "Kettledrum 1861" scratched into it. However, there is absolutely no provenance for this item and many feel that the hoof and the attached shoe are too small to be that of a racehorse.

Writing under the pseudonym "Kettledrum" named after the Derby winner, Edward Hulton was the original tipster of the Sporting Chronicle newspaper he founded in 1871. A tipping column was written by others under the same pseudonym until the newspaper closed in 1983.

== Pedigree ==
Pedigree of Kettledrum (GB), chestnut stallion, 1858
Sire Rataplan (GB) 1850	The Baron; 1842	Birdcatcher	Sir Hercules
Sire Rataplan (GB) 1850	The Baron; 1842	Birdcatcher	Guiccioli
Sire Rataplan (GB) 1850	The Baron; 1842	Echidna	Economist
Sire Rataplan (GB) 1850	The Baron; 1842	Echidna	Miss Pratt
Sire Rataplan (GB) 1850	Pocahontas; 1837	Glencoe	Sultan
Sire Rataplan (GB) 1850	Pocahontas; 1837	Glencoe	Trampoline*
Sire Rataplan (GB) 1850	Pocahontas; 1837	Marpessa	Muley
Sire Rataplan (GB) 1850	Pocahontas; 1837	Marpessa	Clare
Dam Hybla (GB) 1846	The Provost; 1836	The Saddler	Waverley
Dam Hybla (GB) 1846	The Provost; 1836	The Saddler	Castrellina
Dam Hybla (GB) 1846	The Provost; 1836	Rebecca	Lottery*
Dam Hybla (GB) 1846	The Provost; 1836	Rebecca	Cervantes mare
Dam Hybla (GB) 1846	Otisina; 1837	Liverpool	Tramp*
Dam Hybla (GB) 1846	Otisina; 1837	Liverpool	Whisker mare
Dam Hybla (GB) 1846	Otisina; 1837	Otis	Bustard
Dam Hybla (GB) 1846	Otisina; 1837	Otis	Election mare (Family: 3-j)

* Kettledrum is inbred 5S x 5D x 4D to the stallion Tramp, meaning that he appears fifth generation (via Trampoline) on the sire side of his pedigree, and fifth generation (via Lottery) and fourth generation on the dam side of his pedigree.
