= Allied Newspapers =

UK newspaper holding

- Industry: Mass media
- Founded: 1924 (as Associated Newspapers); 1945 (as Kemsley Newspapers)
- Fate: Acquired by Thomson Regional Newspapers (1959)
- Headquarters: London and Manchester, United Kingdom
- Key people: William Berry, 1st Viscount Camrose (chair); Gomer Berry, 1st Viscount Kemsley (chair); Edward Iliffe, 1st Baron Iliffe (deputy chair)
- Products: Newspapers
- Owner: William Berry, 1st Viscount Camrose and Gomer Berry, 1st Viscount Kemsley (1924–1945); Gomer Berry, 1st Viscount Kemsley (1945–1959)

Allied Newspapers Ltd. was a British media consortium with holdings including such national newspapers as The Daily Telegraph and The Sunday Times. Formed in 1924 by the Welsh brothers William Berry, Lord Camrose, and Gomer Berry (later 1st Viscount Kemsley), along with Sir Edward Iliffe (later 1st Baron Iliffe), Allied Newspapers later became Kemsley Newspapers, becoming the largest newspaper group in Britain. The consortium was acquired in 1959 by Roy Thomson (later 1st Baron Thomson of Fleet), becoming part of Thomson Regional Newspapers.

== History ==
=== Background ===
The Berry brothers entered the newspaper business in 1915, purchasing The Sunday Times; they also purchased the Financial Times in 1919. In 1922, Gomer Berry bought the Scottish Daily Record, its sister paper the Sunday Mail, and another newspaper, the Glasgow Evening News, for £1 million. He formed a controlling company known as Associated Scottish Newspapers Ltd.

For his part, Edward Iliffe was already president and principal proprietor of the Birmingham Post and the Birmingham Mail, and owner of the Coventry Evening Telegraph and the Cambridge Daily News.

=== Formation ===
The Berry brothers and Iliffe set up Allied Newspapers in 1924 for the purpose of purchasing the former properties of newspaper proprietor Edward Hulton. (Hulton's son Sir Edward Hulton had expanded his father's newspaper interests and sold his publishing business, based in London and Manchester to Max Aitken, 1st Baron Beaverbrook, and Harold Harmsworth, 1st Viscount Rothermere, when he retired in 1923.) Allied Newspapers' initial acquisitions included the Daily Dispatch, the Manchester Evening Chronicle, the Sunday Chronicle, and the Sunday Graphic, as well as a string of other newspapers across the country. In Cardiff, Wales, the consortium quickly merged four other papers into the Western Mail.

Allied Newspapers' headquarters was located at Withy Grove, The Printworks (Manchester). The Berry Brothers were co-chairmen and Iliff was deputy chairman of the group. The company's northern newspapers were part of the subsidiary Allied Northern Newspapers.

Allied Newspapers acquired the Daily Sketch from Lords Beaverbrook and Rothmere in 1925; in 1926, the Daily Sketch absorbed the Daily Graphic. The Daily Sketch became part of an Allied Newspapers subsidiary in 1928.

=== Growth ===
In 1926, Allied Newspapers purchased Amalgamated Press (AP), adding a thriving story paper, comic book, and book publishing company to their empire.

In 1927, Allied Newspapers bought the paper-making operations of Frank Lloyd, the son of publisher Edward Lloyd; Allied sold the business to Bowater in 1936.

In 1927 Allied Newspapers purchased The Daily Telegraph from the 2nd Harry Levy-Lawson, 1st Viscount Burnham, with Camrose becoming its editor-in-chief. In 1937 the consortium purchased The Telegraph's rival, The Morning Post. Camrose concentrated his efforts on The Daily Telegraph, buying out his partners and merging The Morning Post into The Daily Telegraph. His son Seymour served as Deputy Chairman of The Daily Telegraph from 1939 to 1986. His other son Michael also served as Chairman and Editor-in-Chief of the Daily and Sunday Telegraph newspapers. (The Sunday Telegraph was established in February 1961.)

In addition, Seymour Berry served as Vice Chairman of Amalgamated Press from 1942 to 1959 (when AP was acquired by the Mirror Group).

=== Kemsley Newspapers ===
With Lord Camrose concentrating on The Daily Telegraph, Allied Newspapers was dissolved in 1945 and renamed Kemsley Newspapers, with Gomer Berry (now known as Lord Kemsley) in charge. Meanwhile, Camrose retained Amalgamated Press. (As part of a previous agreement, Lord Camrose simultaneously sold the Financial Times to Brendan Bracken, who merged it with the Financial News.)

From 1945 until the group was sold in 1959, author Ian Fleming served as Kemsley Newspapers' foreign manager, overseeing The Sunday Times' worldwide network of correspondents.

Lord Kemsley served as chairman of the Reuters News Agency from 1951 to 1958.

In 1952 Kemsley sold the Daily Sketch (at that point known as the Daily Graphic) to Esmond Harmsworth, 2nd Viscount Rothermere, and Associated Newspapers, the owner of the Daily Mail. At that point, Lord Kemsley owned 31 newspapers across the U.K, though most were small regional papers.

Kemsley sold his Scottish holdings — the Daily Record, the Sunday Mail and Evening News — to the London-based Mirror Group in 1955.

=== Purchase by Roy Thomson ===
By 1959, Kemsley Newspapers was considered the largest newspaper group in Britain. At that point, it was acquired by Thomson Regional Newspapers, owned by Roy Thomson (later 1st Baron Thomson of Fleet). (At the time of the sale, Lord Kemsley was editor-in-chief of The Sunday Times; his son Lionel Berry, 2nd Viscount Kemsley, was deputy chairman.) Over the years, Thomson expanded his media empire to include more than 200 newspapers in Canada, the United States, and the United Kingdom. His Thomson Organization (established in 1978) became a multinational corporation, with interests in publishing, printing, television, and travel.

Amalgamated Press, meanwhile, was bought by the Mirror Group in 1959 and renamed Fleetway Publications (after the name of AP's headquarters, Fleetway House).

== Allied/Kemsley newspaper holdings ==
- Bristol Times and Mirror (1924–1932; folded)
- Daily Record (Scotland) (1922–1955; sold to the Mirror Group)
- Daily Sketch/Daily Graphic (1925–1952; sold to Associated Newspapers)
- The Daily Telegraph (1927–1937; taken over by Lord Camrose)
- Empire News (1924–1959; sold to Roy Thomson)
- Financial Times (1919–1945; sold to Brendan Bracken)
- Glasgow Evening News (1922–1955; sold to the Mirror Group)
- Manchester Evening Chronicle (1924–1959; sold to Roy Thomson)
- The Morning Post (1937; merged into The Daily Telegraph)
- Sunday Chronicle (1924–1955; merged into the Empire News)
- Sunday Graphic (1924–1959; sold to Roy Thomson)
- Sunday Mail (Scotland) (1922–1955; sold to the Mirror Group)
- Sunday News (1931; merged into the Sunday Graphic)
- The Sunday Times (1915–1959; sold to Roy Thomson)
- Western Mail (c. 1924–1959; sold to Roy Thomson)
