= Trekking during the Blitz =

Mass movement of Britons during the Blitz

Large numbers of British civilians engaged in trekking during the Blitz. This involved leaving cities at night to sleep in nearby towns and rural areas. The practice was most prevalent in provincial cities during early 1941. While the British Government was concerned that trekking indicated that civilian morale was under strain, the practice was generally motivated by a desire to avoid the risk of death or injury and to be able to sleep.

== Incidence ==
Trekking involved civilians in cities which were threatened with air attack during the Blitz leaving their homes at night to sleep in nearby towns and rural areas. These movements were not officially organised.

Relatively few Londoners engaged in trekking compared to residents of secondary cities. The practice was most prevalent in London during the early stages of the Blitz in September 1940, with some civilians evacuating to the edge of the city and nearby towns. Some people who evacuated London each night did so in their cars, which they slept in. Large numbers of civilians also relocated to towns near London for short periods following large air raids. The journalist Hilde Marchant observed trekkers departing London, and believed that this was comparable to the evacuations by civilians she had observed during the Spanish Civil War. Trekking led to a need for government agencies to provide food and shelter for the temporary refugees. The scale of trekking from London dropped over time as civilians grew accustomed to the nightly air raids. However, large numbers of people trekked within the city by taking over and sleeping in London Underground stations.

Trekking was more common in provincial cities. These cities were not as well prepared for air attack as London as they had fewer air raid shelters and facilities for civilians affected by the raids to rest and access aid. Smaller numbers of civilians had also been evacuated from the provincial cities compared to London.

Attacks on the provincial cities in early 1941 led to large numbers of nightly trekkers leaving cities such as Bristol, Coventry, Kingston upon Hull, Plymouth, Southampton and Swansea. After Plymouth was attacked for five nights in April 1941 at least 30,000 people left the city each night over the next two weeks, with numbers peaking at around 50,000 on 24 April. On 10 May between 40,000 and 45,000 trekkers departed Merseyside to spend the night in nearby areas. Large numbers also left Belfast after the city was bombed in April 1941, with people who did so being locally referred to as "ditchers". It has been estimated that 30,000 people left Belfast after air raid sirens were sounded at 2 am on 23 July, with this proving to be a false alarm. While the number of trekkers was large, the British official history notes that they were "small in comparison with the total of people made homeless by the attacks on provincial and Scottish cities during 1940–41". As trekkers returned to their home city each day, they were typically as productive in their work as people who remained at home.

Trekkers often slept rough, especially during the first nights of a period of trekking. Few were able to sustain this for long, with those who could afford to do so taking out lodgings from which they returned to their city during the day.

== Motivations ==
Prior to and during the Blitz the British Government believed that large-scale trekking was an indicator of falling civilian morale. For instance, the Ministry of Information judged in April 1941 that trekkers formed part of segment of the population with "weaker mental-make up than the rest" and were "potentially neurotic". As a result, the government was alarmed by the large number of trekkers in 1941. Herbert Morrison, the Home Secretary, was concerned that the Germans might take advantage of the situation.

Research undertaken by the Ministry of Home Security found that trekking was generally not associated with a fall in morale. By far the most important factor motivating trekking was a desire to sleep, with many civilians finding it was impossible to do so while awaiting a possible air attack or enduring a raid. Due to the lack of air raid shelters in provincial cities, it was necessary to leave them to be guaranteed a good night's sleep; in comparison, many Londoners were able to sleep in public air raid shelters and Underground stations. The research also found that a fear of death or injury from bombs led to trekking. The official history judges that, as a result, trekking was one of the ways civilians adapted to the demands of the war.

Writing in 2002, the historian Robert Mackay noted that trekking was mainly undertaken as it allowed workers to retain their jobs and householders to supervise their semi-abandoned homes. Many trekkers were resentful of the government for failing to protect them. He also stated that "the whole idea of using trekking as a bell-wether of civilian morale looks absurd". In contrast, the historian Brian Barton judged in 1997 that the trekking from Belfast was linked to a collapse in morale in the city, as well as a fear of being killed or wounded. Mark Clapson has supported the official history's conclusions, and found that trekking was a rational response by civilians to the conditions they faced.

== Government response ==
Due to its belief that trekking was a sign of falling morale, the British Government initially tried to discourage the large scale nightly movements from provincial cities during early 1941 by not providing any services to facilitate it, such as organising places for people to sleep. However, bus companies organised special services and individual military personnel provided transport on an unofficial basis. Local councils also provided some aid, and many householders invited trekkers into their home. These efforts were insufficient, and many trekkers slept in unsuitable and unhygienic conditions. These included every available type of building, including churches and barns, as well as ditches and open fields. Due to the conditions endured by trekkers, the Ministry of Health dispatched staff to the Plymouth area in April 1941 to improve conditions there.

In May 1941 the British Government directed that rest centres to accommodate trekkers be prepared around the provincial cities which were likely to be attacked. Work on these facilities began the next month, but they proved unneeded as the large-scale German air raids on British cities had ended in May and were not resumed. The official history states that there were no further large movements of trekkers for the remainder of the war. However, historian Jan Gore has written that large numbers of people left Exeter nightly after the first raid of the Exeter Blitz in April and May 1942. The numbers of trekkers in Exeter has been estimated as between 6,000 and 10,000 and they overwhelmed the capacity of the local rest centres.

== See also ==
- Evacuations of civilians in Britain during World War II
