= Manchester Evening Chronicle =

- Type: Daily newspaper
- Owner(s): Edward Hulton (1897–1923); Allied Newspapers (1924–1959); Roy Thomson (1959–1963)
- Founder: Edward Hulton
- Founded: 1897; 129 years ago in Manchester
- Ceased publication: 1963; 63 years ago; merged into the Manchester Evening News
- Headquarters: Manchester

Manchester Evening Chronicle was a newspaper established by Sir Edward Hulton, a Manchester City chairman, a newspaper proprietor and a racehorse owner. It started publication in 1897, was renamed Evening Chronicle in 1914 but stayed in Manchester. It continued publication under various ownerships until 1963, when it was merged with the more successful Manchester Evening News and discontinued publication.

== History ==
Hulton's father Edward Hulton was a well-known publisher and had founded earlier the Sporting Chronicle in 1871, the Athletic News in 1875 and the Sunday Chronicle in 1885. Besides the Manchester Evening Chronicle, Sir Edward Hulton also founded the Daily Dispatch in 1900 and the Daily Sketch tabloid newspaper in 1909.

The Manchester Evening Chronicle was renamed Evening Chronicle in 1914.

Edward Hulton and Co., of London and Manchester, a private company of proprietors, printers and publishers, was sold for £6 million when Hulton retired due to illness in 1923. The newspapers were sold, including the Manchester Evening Chronicle. The paper became controlled by Lord Beaverbrook and Lord Rothermere.

Most of Hulton newspapers were sold again soon afterwards, to the Allied Newspapers consortium formed in 1924 (renamed Kemsley Newspapers in 1943 and bought by Roy Thomson in 1959).

Almost all the newspapers Hulton founded have since merged with other newspapers. In 1955 the Daily Dispatch merged with the News Chronicle, which was subsequently absorbed into the Daily Mail in 1960. The Evening Chronicle on the other hand, ailing by the 1960s was merged with the more successful Manchester Evening News in 1963.

== Tournaments ==
Manchester Evening Chronicle also organized various sports events, notably The Manchester Evening Chronicle Tournament, a professional golf tournament played at Mere Golf Club in Mere, Cheshire, England. It was held from 1947 to 1949. Total prize money was £1400 in 1947 and £1500 in 1948 and 1949. The event was won by Belgian Flory Van Donck in 1947, by Australian Norman Von Nida in 1948 and Northern Irish golfer Fred Daly in 1949.
