= Tenpin Ltd =

Ten-pin bowling brand in the United Kingdom

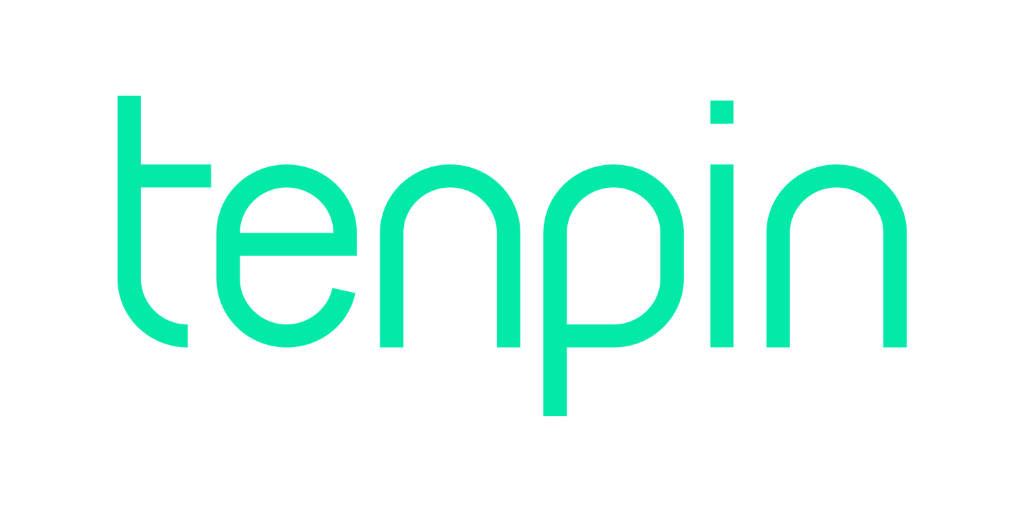
- Formerly: Megabowl; Tenpin 10
- Industry: Bowling, entertainment/leisure
- Headquarters: Cranfield, Bedfordshire, England, UK
- Number of locations: 60 (2026)
- Area served: United Kingdom
- Owner: Ten Entertainment Group
- Website: https://www.tenpin.co.uk/

Tenpin Ltd (stylized tenpin, and formerly known as Megabowl and Tenpin 10) is one of the largest ten-pin bowling brands in the United Kingdom, consisting of 60 bowling centres ranging from 10 to 36 lanes (depending on the size of the centre), which often have on-site bars serving food and drinks. They are principally located on retail and leisure parks alongside family leisure brands.

The brand was formerly owned by Essenden Ltd, now Ten Entertainment Group plc who are a member of the Tenpin Bowling Proprietors Association (TBPA). The company is headquartered in Cranfield, Bedfordshire.

== Operations ==
Many centres also include amusement arcades with attractions such as Sector 7 laser tag, table tennis, air hockey, pool, soft play, karaoke, escape rooms, escape themed crazy golf and interactive darts. Many existing sites were formerly known as Megabowl until they were refurbished and reopened as a Tenpin site under the name Tenpin 10 by 2008 - whereas all centres also saw new facilities (such as Sector 7, then known as Quasar) coming in and some old facilities (such as McDonald's, Burger King & Wimpy outlets) going out, as well as removing a small number of lanes in some centres (e.g. the original ex-Megabowl site at Chester previously had 30 lanes, but then this was reduced to 28 after refurbishment).

Tenpin carried out another major rebranding during the late 2010s under the motto "Eat, Drink, Play, Bowl", which involved refurbishing and modernising all sites with new colour schemes and a number of major improvements including new lane lighting, faster pin settings, flat-screen TVs above the lanes (replacing the old CRT ones), touch-screen tablets in the seating areas (replacing the old computer keyboard-style terminals) and additional on-site attractions including escape rooms, hyper bowling and karaoke lounges.

Tenpin sites are also used as venues for local and national ten-pin league competitions.

In the early 2020s, Tenpin's music video feed that played a variety of modern-day songs from the last two to three years had ceased broadcasting in the majority of their centres after many years, and was replaced by an audio-only service which not only plays songs from the last two to three years as before, but a selection of older modern-day songs from the last 20 to 30 years are also played alongside.

== List of current locations ==
- Acton
- Bexleyheath
- Birmingham (Star City)
- Blackburn
- Blackpool
- Bristol
- Camberley
- Cambridge
- Cardiff
- Castleford
- Cheshire Oaks
- Chester (Retail Park)
- Chichester
- Clydebank
- Colchester
- Coventry
- Crewe
- Croydon
- Derby
- Dewsbury
- Doncaster
- Dudley
- Dundee (Kingsway West)
- Eastbourne
- Edinburgh (Fountain Park)
- Exeter
- Falkirk
- Feltham
- Glasgow (Braehead)
- Glenrothes
- Gloucester
- Harlow
- Ipswich
- Kingston upon Thames
- Leamington Spa
- Leeds
- Luton
- Manchester (Harpurhey)
- Manchester (Parrs Wood)
- Manchester (Printworks)
- Milton Keynes
- Northampton
- Nottingham
- Plymouth Barbican
- Redditch
- Rochdale
- Sheffield
- Southampton
- Southport
- Stafford
- Stoke
- Swansea
- Swindon
- Telford
- Wakefield
- Walsall
- Warrington
- Worcester
- Wrexham
- York

== List of closed or sold off locations ==
- Bournemouth
- Bristol - Closed as a Megabowl, then demolished and turned into flats.
- Cardiff (original site) - closed 2008
- Chelmsford
- Chester (Greyhound Park) - closed on 10 October 2013 along with the Cineworld 6-screen multiplex cinema located adjacent to the centre. Both complexes on-site have since been demolished, and replaced with an Asda supermarket in 2014. Reopened at Chester Retail Park in March 2024.
- Dundee (The Stack Leisure Park)
- Edinburgh (Fort Kinnaird) - closed 2008
- Gateshead (Metro Centre) - closed 2008
- Hull - closed 2009
- Maidenhead - closed August 2018
- Milton Keynes (Leisure Plaza)
- Newport - closed as Megabowl on 22 August 2005, and was left empty with advertising and external signage still visible until 2016. The building is now a Home Bargains store, gym and ENERGI trampoline park.
- Redditch - Reopened in new location in July 2025
- Stevenage
- Streatham - Closed in August 2006 as Megabowl, then became derelict for a few years with signage still visible before being converted into an M&S Food Hall
- Sunderland
- Tower Park (Poole) - Now operated by Hollywood Bowl Group.
