= Jocelyn Stevens =

British publisher (1932–2014)

Sir Jocelyn Stevens CVO
- Born: Jocelyn Edward Greville Stevens; 14 February 1932; Marylebone, London, England
- Died: 9 October 2014 (aged 82)
- Occupations: Magazine publisher, newspaper executive
- Spouse(s): Jane Armyne Sheffield (1956–1979); Emma Cheape (2008–2014)
- Partner(s): Vivien Duffield (1973–2005)
- Children: 4
- Relatives: Edward Hulton (great-grandfather); Sir Edward Hulton, 1st Baronet (grandfather); Sir Edward George Warris Hulton (uncle); Poppy Delevingne (granddaughter); Cara Delevingne (granddaughter)

Sir Jocelyn Edward Greville Stevens, CVO (14 February 1932 – 9 October 2014) was the British publisher of Queen magazine and later the chairman of English Heritage.

== Education and career ==
Stevens attended Eton College and Trinity College, Cambridge, and Sandhurst, where he won the Sword of Honour. He went on to do national service in the Rifle Brigade.

He built a career in journalism and publishing. In 1957, he bought the British high society publication The Queen, which he revamped, renaming it Queen and hiring Beatrix Miller as editor. He hired Mark Boxer as art director and Antony Armstrong-Jones, future husband of Princess Margaret, as photographer.

In the 1960s, he provided financial backing for the first British pirate radio station Radio Caroline. In the 1960s–1970s, he was named as managing director of the Evening Standard and Daily Express newspapers. A British newspaper obituary observed that, in the course of his newspaper career, Stevens "revelled in his image as a posh bully, living up, or down, to Private Eye's nickname for him: 'Piranha teeth.'"

Stevens was Rector of the Royal College of Art from 1984 to 1992 and then Chairman of English Heritage from 1992 to 2000. In 1992, he was awarded a CVO for his part in curating the Sovereign Exhibition at the Victoria and Albert Museum, and he was knighted in 1996.

== Family ==
Stevens was born in Marylebone, Central London, England. He was son of Major Charles Greville Bartlett Stevens ("Stewart-Stevens" following his second marriage, to Muriel Stewart, 10th Lady of Balnakeilly, Pitlochry, Perthshire, Scotland) and his first wife Elizabeth ("Betty"), daughter of Sir Edward Hulton, 1st Baronet and his second wife, the music hall artist, actress and singer Millie Lindon. Betty died shortly after her son's birth. His father blamed Stevens for his mother's death, and the child was left in a flat near to Baker Street in London, attended to by nannies, a maid, a cook, a priest and a chauffeur.

He was maternal nephew of the magazine publisher Sir Edward George Warris Hulton. His step-brother was the military officer Sir Blair Stewart-Wilson, Equerry to Her Majesty The Queen and Deputy Master of the Household in the Royal Household from 1976 to 1994. His step-sister Prudence, Lady Penn (née Stewart-Wilson), was a Lady-in-Waiting to Queen Elizabeth The Queen Mother and the wife of the former Comptroller of the Lord Chamberlain's Office, Lieutenant-Colonel Sir Eric Penn.

He was married to Jane Armyne Sheffield, daughter of John Vincent Sheffield and wife Ann Margaret Faudel-Phillips, paternal granddaughter of the 6th Baronet Sheffield and maternal granddaughter of the 3rd and last of the Faudel-Phillips baronets, and a Lady-in-Waiting to Princess Margaret, for 23 years until 1979. They had four children, two sons and two daughters. Their daughter Pandora married property developer Charles Delevingne and they have three daughters, Chloe, and models Poppy Delevingne and Cara Delevingne. Stevens was a long-term partner of the philanthropist Dame Vivien Duffield until they separated in 2005.

In 2008, he married Emma Margaret Ismay Cheape, daughter of the late Sir Iain Tennant and former wife of Angus Ismay Cheape.
