= S.L. Benfica (billiards) =

Benfica
- Full name: Sport Lisboa e Benfica
- Founded: 2 November 1938
- Manager: Vasco Manuel da Cruz Gomes
- League: Portuguese Billiards League
- 2011–12: 1st at Snooker, American Pool, Women's Pool
- Website: http://www.slbenfica.pt/pt-pt/mais/bilhar.aspx

Sport Lisboa e Benfica (Portuguese pronunciation: [sɨˈpɔɾ liʒˈβoɐ i βɐ̃jˈfikɐ]), commonly known as Benfica, is a semi-professional billiards team based in Lisbon, Portugal. Founded in 1938, Benfica compete in the Portuguese Billiards League, in carom billiards (three-cushion), pool (eight-ball and nine-ball), and snooker events. The team is almost exclusively composed of Portuguese players. They play at the Estádio da Luz in a 202 square meters room with 4 professional pool tables and a 50 people stand.

== History ==
The billiard section was created in 1938–39 with players like Alvaro Figueiredo de Lima, Maximiano Varges Henrique da Costa Santos and Aguinaldo Cacho. The section continued to grow and in the sixties it won its first regional title in 66/67 and by 69 its first national championship. Also in 69 it participated for the first time into the CEB European Three-cushion Championship.

Between 1983 and 2000, Benfica won most of its titles, 10 Regional Championships, 6 National Championships, 2 Portuguese Cups and 3 Supercups.

In 2002/03, Benfica hired Dick Jaspers, Dion Nelin, Henrique Penalva, Jaime Faraco in an attempt to win the CEB European Three-cushion Championship but it only managed a second place.

In 2011/12, Benfica won a combined number of 13 titles, 9 for teams.

== Men's honours ==
According to Benfica's official website

=== Three Cushin ===
- Portuguese Three-cushion Men's Billiards Championship

Winners (9): 1968–69, 1970–71, 1976–77, 1984–85, 1985–86, 1986–87, 1988–89, 1991–92, 1994–95

- Portuguese Three-cushion Men's Billiards Cup

Winners (2): 1992–93, 1999–2000

- Portuguese Three-cushion Men's Billiards Super Cup

Winners (3): 1992–93, 1994–95, 1997–98

- Lisbon Regional Three-cushion Men's Billiards Championship

Winners (15): 1966–67, 1970–71, 1973–74, 1974–75, 1975–76, 1982–83, 1983–84, 1985–86, 1986–87, 1987–88, 1988–89, 1991–92, 1992–93, 1993–94, 1994–95

- CEB European Three-cushion Championship:

Runners-up: 2002–03

=== Pool ===
- Portuguese Pool Men's Billiards Cup

Winners (1): 2010–11, 2011–12

- Portuguese Pool Men's Billiards Super Cup

Winners (3): 2011–12

=== American Pool ===
- Portuguese American Pool Men's Billiards Championship

Winners (1): 2011–12

- Portuguese American Pool Men's Billiards Cup

Winners (1): 2010–11, 11–12

- Portuguese American Pool Men's Billiards Super Cup

Winners (1): 2011–12

=== Snooker ===
- Portuguese Snooker Men's Billiards Championship

Winners (2): 2011–12, 2013–14

- Portuguese Snooker Men's Billiards Championship
- Winners (2): 2013, 2014

== Women's honours ==
=== Pool ===
- Portuguese Pool Women's Billiards Championship

Winners (1): 2011–12

- Portuguese Pool Women's Billiards Cup

Winners (1): 2010–11, 2011–12

== Current squad ==
Name	Nat.	Sport practised
António Rodrigues	(Portugal)	Three-cushion
António Figueiredo	(Portugal)	Three-cushion
Carlos Marques	(Portugal)	Three-cushion
Carlos Venda	(Portugal)	Three-cushion
Fernando Maia	(Portugal)	Three-cushion
Fernando Tomás	(Portugal)	Three-cushion
Guerra Santos	(Portugal)	Three-cushion
Henrique Louro	(Portugal)	Three-cushion
Joaquim Torres	(Portugal)	Three-cushion
João Silva	(Portugal)	Three-cushion-Snooker
José Antunes	(Portugal)	Three-cushion
Jorge Ribeiro	(Portugal)	Three-cushion
Mário Chaves	(Portugal)	Three-cushion
Rui Vasconcelos	(Portugal)	Three-cushion
Vasco Gomes	(Portugal)	Three-cushion

Name	Nat.	Sport practised
Henrique Correia	(Portugal)	Pool-American Pool-Snooker
João Grilo	(Portugal)	Pool-American Pool-Snooker
Jorge Tinoco	(Portugal)	Pool-American Pool
Nuno Santos	(Portugal)	Pool-American Pool-Snooker
Pedro France	(Portugal)	Pool-American Pool
Rui Edgar	(Portugal)	Pool-American Pool
Ana Oliveira	(Portugal)	Pool
Ana Pires	(Portugal)	Pool
Anna Gradisnik	(Slovenia)	Pool
Helena Moreira	(Portugal)	Pool
Lídia Moreira	(Portugal)	Pool
Marta Tavares	(Portugal)	Pool
Sara Rocha	(Portugal)	Pool

Name	Nat.	Sport practised
Filipe Correia	(Portugal)	Pool
Ivan Coelho	(Portugal)	Pool
João Costa	(Portugal)	Pool
Klemen Gradisnik	(Slovenia)	Pool
Mauro Marianito	(Portugal)	Pool
Sérgio Almeida	(Portugal)	Pool

== Notable past athletes ==
- Alvaro Figueiredo de Lima
- Maximiano Varges Henrique da Costa Santos
- Aguinaldo Cacho
- Manuel Rodriguez
- José Tavares
- Alvaro Lima
- Artur Ribeiro
- Eduardo Martins
- José Alabern
- Alvaro Araujo de Oliveira
- Alfredo Ferraz
- Jorge Pinto
- Dr. Joaquim Lourenço Gago
- João Pereira
- Manuel Barroso Sanchez
- Victor Hugo Leal
- Vladimiro Correia Monteiro
- Carlos Alberto França
- Ilídio Gomes
- Mário Machado
- Vladimiro Monteiro
- Mário Ribeiro
- Victor Hugo Leal

== Technical staff ==
Name	Nat.	Job
Sr. Porfírio José da Silva	(Portugal)	Financial Manager
Sr. João Maria Marinho de Abreu	(Portugal)	Infrastructures Area
Eng.º Eduardo Lucas Paixão	(Portugal)	Informatics, Communication and Marketing Area
Sr. Ricardo Jorge Veloso Simões	(Portugal)	Pool Area
