= The Printworks =

Printworks may refer to:

- Printworks (London), a nightclub and events space in Rotherhithe
- The Printworks (Manchester), an entertainment venue
- Printworks Campus, of the Leeds City College
