= Edward Hulton =

British newspaper proprietor and thoroughbred racehorse owner

Sir Edward Hulton
- Born: Edward Hulton; 3 March 1869; Hulme, Manchester, England
- Died: 23 May 1925 (aged 56); Downside, Surrey, England
- Resting place: Putney Vale Cemetery, London; 51.440522°N 0.239189°W
- Occupation: Newspaper proprietor
- Spouse(s): Agnes Moir Wood (m. 1900) Millie Lindon (m. 1916)
- Children: 2
- Relatives: Edward Hulton (father); Margaret, Lady Strickland (sister); Sir Edward George Warris Hulton (son); Sir Jocelyn Stevens (grandson)

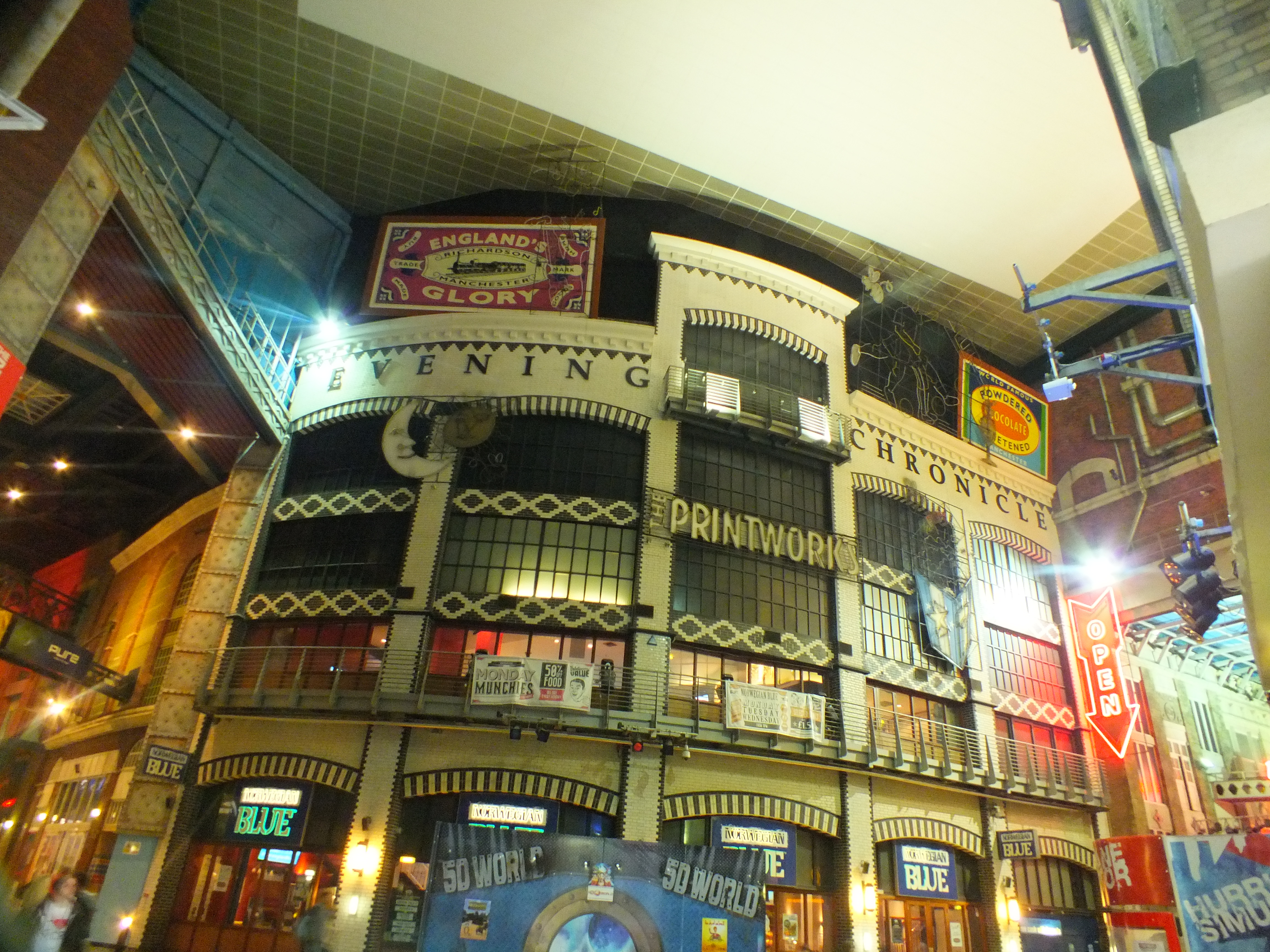
Evening Chronicle signage inside The Printworks developed on the former Manchester site of Edward Hulton and Co.

Sir Edward Hulton, 1st Baronet (3 March 1869 – 23 May 1925), was a British newspaper proprietor and thoroughbred racehorse owner.

In 1921, he was awarded a baronetcy, of Downside in the parish of Leatherhead in Surrey, for public services during World War I, which became extinct on his death in 1925.

== Early life ==
Hulton was born on 3 March 1869 in Hulme, Manchester. He was the second son of Edward Hulton (1838–1904), a Manchester newspaper publisher, and his wife, Mary Mosley.

He was raised as a Roman Catholic in Whalley Range, Manchester and attended St Bede's Commercial College from 1878 to 1885.

== Newspapers ==
Hulton's father founded the Sporting Chronicle in 1871, the Athletic News in 1875 and the Sunday Chronicle in 1885. Hulton subsequently founded the Manchester Evening Chronicle in 1897 (renamed the Evening Chronicle in 1914), the Daily Dispatch in 1900 and the Daily Sketch, a tabloid, in 1909.

Edward Hulton and Co., of London and Manchester, a private company of proprietors, printers and publishers that owned a large group of newspapers was sold for £6 million when Hulton retired due to illness in 1923. The newspapers sold, which were subsequently controlled by Lord Beaverbrook and Lord Rothermere, included: Sporting Chronicle, Athletic News, Sunday Chronicle, Empire News, Evening Standard, Daily Sketch, Sunday Herald, Daily Dispatch and Evening Chronicle.

Most of these newspapers were sold again soon afterwards, to the Allied Newspapers consortium formed in 1924 (renamed Kemsley Newspapers in 1943 and bought by Roy Thomson in 1959).

The newspapers Hulton founded have since merged with other newspapers. In 1955, the Daily Dispatch merged with the News Chronicle, which was subsequently absorbed into the Daily Mail in 1960. The Evening Chronicle merged with the Manchester Evening News in 1963. The Daily Sketch merged with the Daily Mail in 1971.

== Sport ==
Hulton owned a successful thoroughbred horse racing stable. With Richard Dawson training his horses, he was the British flat racing Champion Owner in 1916. That year his wins included the filly Fifinella capturing The Oaks and The Derby double. His horses Roseway and Straitlace won the 1919 1,000 Guineas and the 1924 Epsom Oaks respectively. He also registered his racing colours under the pseudonym "Mr. Lytham".

Hulton was the chairman of Manchester City F.C. in the early 1900s.

== Marriages and children ==
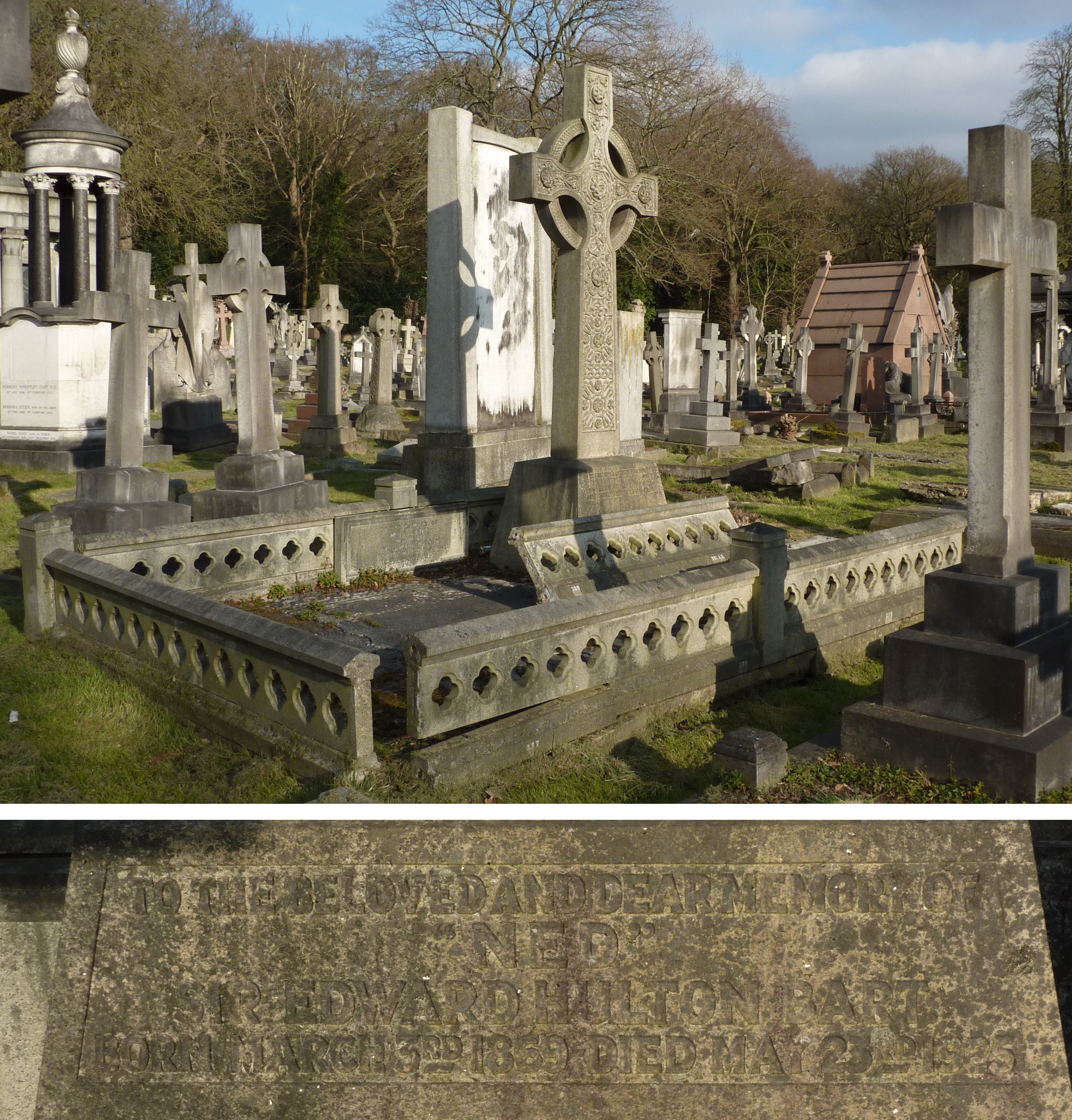
Hulton's grave at Putney Vale Cemetery, London, in 2015

Hulton was first married to Agnes Moir Turnbull Wood in 1900. He had a son and a daughter by his second wife, Fanny Warris (1869–1940), whom he married in 1916.

Warris was a music hall artist, actress and singer, née Fanny Elizabeth Warriss or Wariss, also known by the stage name Millie Lindon, and a cousin of the Rudge Sisters.

Edward's son, Sir Edward George Warris Hulton (1906–1988), published magazines including Picture Post and Lilliput, and was a member of the 1941 Committee. As Edward George Warris was born before his parents were married, he did not inherit the Hulton baronetcy which became extinct on his father's death in 1925. Edward George Warris had two sons and a daughter by his second wife Princess Nika Yourievitch. Edward's daughter, Betty Stevens (née Hulton; 1909–1932), died at the age of 22 following the birth of her son, Sir Jocelyn Stevens.

== Death ==
Hulton died in Downside on 23 May 1925 at the age of 56 after a prolonged illness, and is buried in Putney Vale Cemetery in southwest London. The net value of his estate was £2,222,471. He bequeathed £5,000 to the Catholic Church of Our Lady and St Peter, Leatherhead, for which he previously helped finance a new church building completed in 1923.
