= Rory Macnamara =

British businessman (1955–2016)

Rory Patrick Macnamara (2 January 1955 – 17 December 2016) was a British businessman. He was non-executive director on the board of Alliance Trust plc. which he joined in 2015. In 1981, Macnamara joined merchant bank Morgan Grenfell where he became deputy chairman and responsible for obtaining the funding for the construction of the Eurotunnel. He was chairman of Izodia, Essenden, and Mecom Group. He was the master of the Grocers' Company.
