= Boom Battle Bar =

Chain eatertainment business

- Type: Private
- Industry: Arcade; Bar; Franchising; Eatertainment; Leisure
- Founded: 2020; 6 years ago
- Founder: Elliott Shuttleworth; Richard Beese
- Headquarters: London
- Number of locations: 29
- Area served: United Kingdom; Dubai (formerly)
- Key people: Richard Harpham (CEO of XP Factory)
- Parent: XP Factory plc
- Website: boombattlebar.com

BBB Franchise Ltd., trading as Boom Battle Bar, is a British bar and entertainment chain founded by Elliott Shuttleworth and Richard Beese with 29 locations in the United Kingdom and headquarters on Oxford Street. The first location opened in July 2020.

== History ==
In February 2020, the company announced plans to open its first location at Norwich's Castle Quarter shopping centre, with 10 April set as the target opening date. On 26 March, it was granted a licence to serve alcohol by Norwich City Council's licensing team. The opening was postponed due to nationwide COVID-19 restrictions that had been implemented. The location opened in July, when the restrictions had eased.

In November 2021, it was announced that escape room company Escape Hunt were set to acquire the company from MFT Capital Ltd for a total of £17.38 million. The following month, on 9 December 2021, the chain opened its largest branch spanning 17,000 sq ft, inside The O2 entertainment district on the Greenwich Peninsula.

== Operations ==
Boom Battle Bar signage in Coventry.

A branch in Aldgate, London.

Boom utilises eatertainment (Note: Portmanteau of "Eating" and "Entertainment".) by allowing customers to digitally order food and drinks while actively participating in games and activities through QR codes placed on tables, in addition to ordering with staff and at the bar, with the exception of the axe throwing area where alcohol cannot be sold or consumed. Their menu consists of street food-style dishes, craft beer, and cocktails.

As the chain specialises in competitive socialising, its locations typically feature activities such as air hockey, American pool, arcade games, augmented reality (AR) darts, axe throwing, beer pong, crazy golf, karaoke, and shuffleboard. Some of their locations host DJs and live music performances. Their locations are open to families and those under-18 who are accompanied by an adult until 7pm. Afterwards, a curfew is enforced, in which they only permit customers aged 18 and over, due to licensing laws.

=== Axe throwing concerns and protocol ===
In January 2021, Oxford Police raised concerns over the possibility axes used for axe throwing could be taken from away the Oxford venue. In November 2021, Ipswich Police took issue with the Ipswich venue over "the use of weapons, namely axes" in a venue where alcohol is sold and children can be present. Boom's procedure for the activity is that players must complete a liability waiver and present their driver's license or passport as a form of photo identification, be aged 18 or over, and undergo a breathalyser test beforehand to ensure they are not intoxicated. Those who are successfully cleared to partake are subsequently assessed by a staff member before and during their participation.

== Sponsorship ==
In September 2022, Scottish professional ice hockey team Glasgow Clan, of the Elite Ice Hockey League, revealed Boom as their sponsorship partners for the 2022 to 2023 season. They additionally sponsored Clan player Nolan LaPorte during this time. In November 2022, they sponsored professional association football club Swindon Town F.C. for the remainder of the 2022 to 2023 season. Since 2023, they have been a sponsorship partner of British professional ice hockey team Coventry Blaze.

== International ==
=== Former ===
On 5 July 2023, it was announced that Boom would launch its first international franchise in Dubai, United Arab Emirates at the Jumeirah Beach Residence's DoubleTree by Hilton hotel. It opened on 15 July. Unlike its UK venues, the venue only admitted guests over the age of 21. It permanently closed in June 2026. A representative for the venue issued a statement on its official Instagram account regarding the closure and stated that "a difficult decision" was made to close the branch.
