= Sporting Chronicle =

British horse-racing newspaper

- Type: Daily
- Founder: Edward Hulton
- Publisher: Thomson Newspapers
- Founded: 1871
- Ceased publication: 1983
- Language: English
- Headquarters: Manchester
- Circulation: 30,000–120,000
- Sister newspapers: Athletic News; Sunday Chronicle; Manchester Evening Chronicle; Daily Dispatch

The Sporting Chronicle, known colloquially as The Chron, was a Manchester-based, daily, national horse racing newspaper which operated in Great Britain for 112 years until its closure in 1983 due to unsustainable losses (£5.8 million since 1975). The last edition was published on 23 July of that year.

It was established in 1871 by Edward "Ned" Hulton, who founded other newspapers including the Athletic News which merged with the Sporting Chronicle in 1931 and the Sunday Chronicle, and whose son Edward Hulton founded the Manchester Evening Chronicle and the Daily Dispatch. By 1883, it had a daily readership of 30,000. In its heyday circulation topped 120,000, but by the time of its closure it had dwindled to 33,000. Throughout its existence it had a keenly fought rivalry with the Sporting Life, Sporting Life being more widely read in the south, the Sporting Chronicle in the north. The demise of the Sporting Chronicle left Sporting Life as the only racing daily, until the advent of the Racing Post a few years later. After its closure, many of the staff moved on to Sporting Life or the Racing Post, including the Racing Post's founding editor, Graham Rock. Other staff included Tom Kelly, who went on to be head of the Association of British Bookmakers.

The Sporting Chronicle was a pioneer of tipsters, one of the first being "Kettledrum", a pseudonym for Hulton himself. The paper also published an annual.

== Bibliography ==
- Clapson, Mark (1992). A Bit of a Flutter: Popular Gambling and English Society, C.1823-1961. Manchester, England: Manchester University Press. ISBN 9780719034367.
