= The Printworks (Manchester) =

Venue in Manchester, England

Coordinates: 53°29′07″N 2°14′29″W

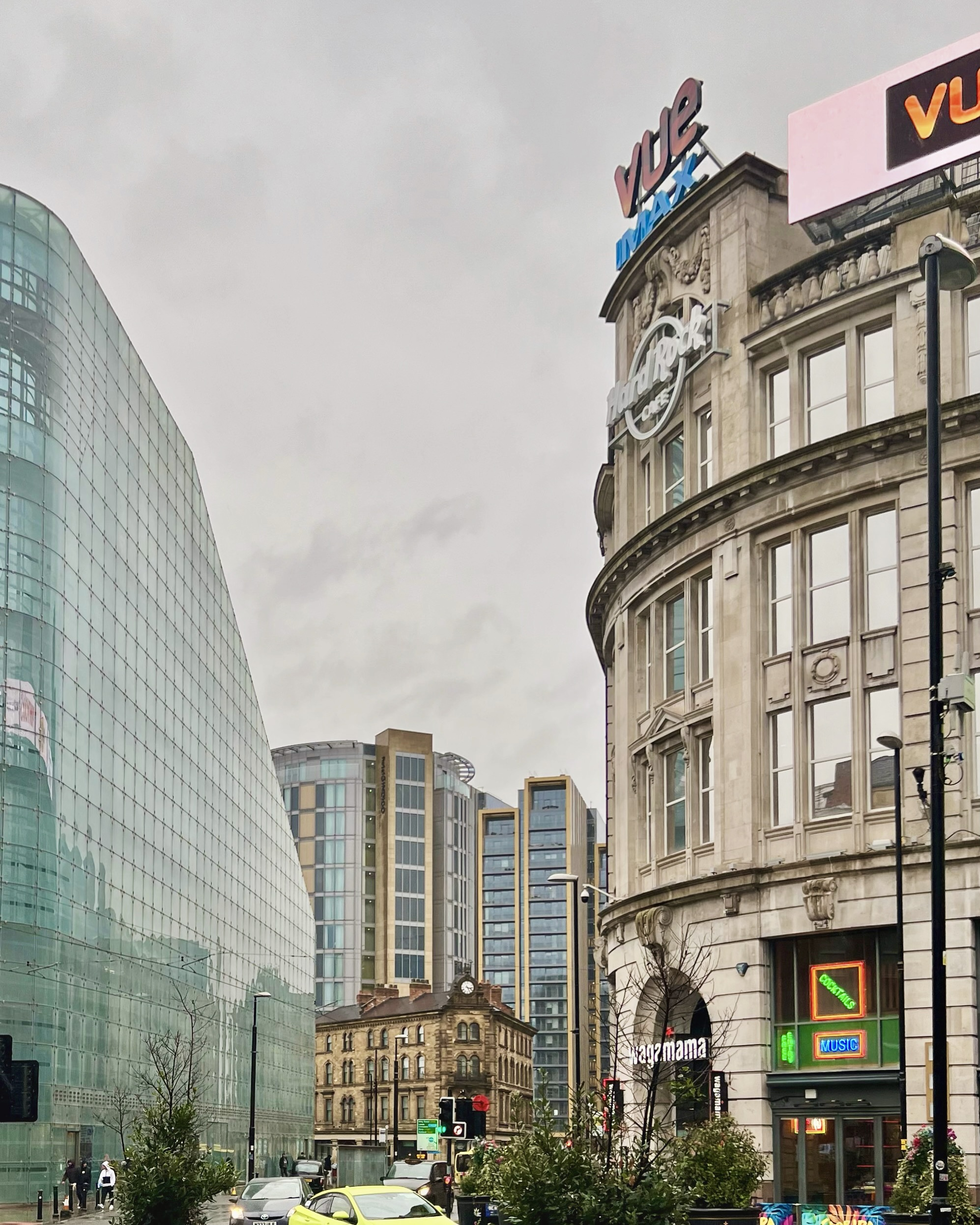
Façade of the Printworks, Manchester (right)

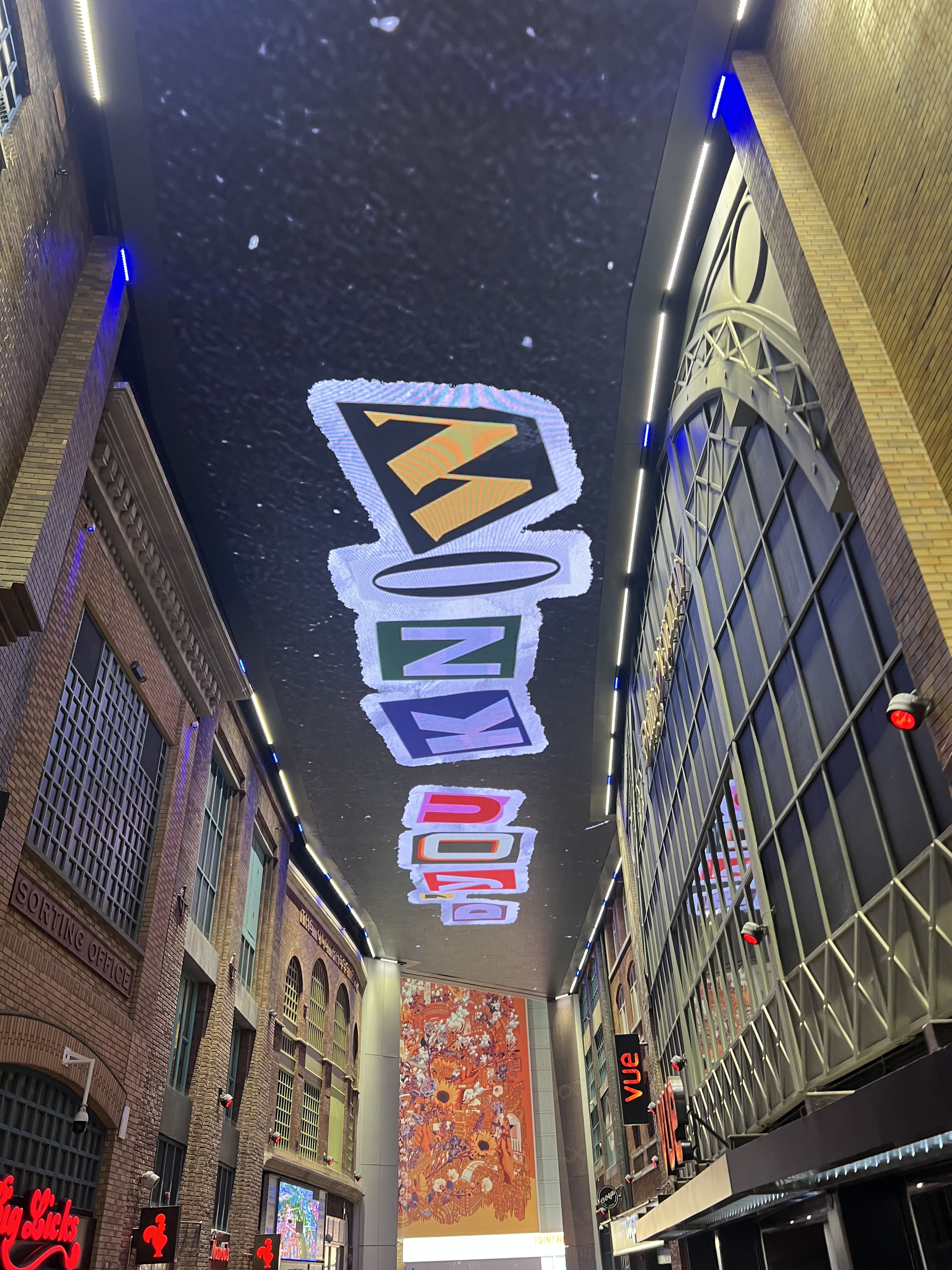
Interior of the Printworks, Manchester showing the "Digital Ceiling"

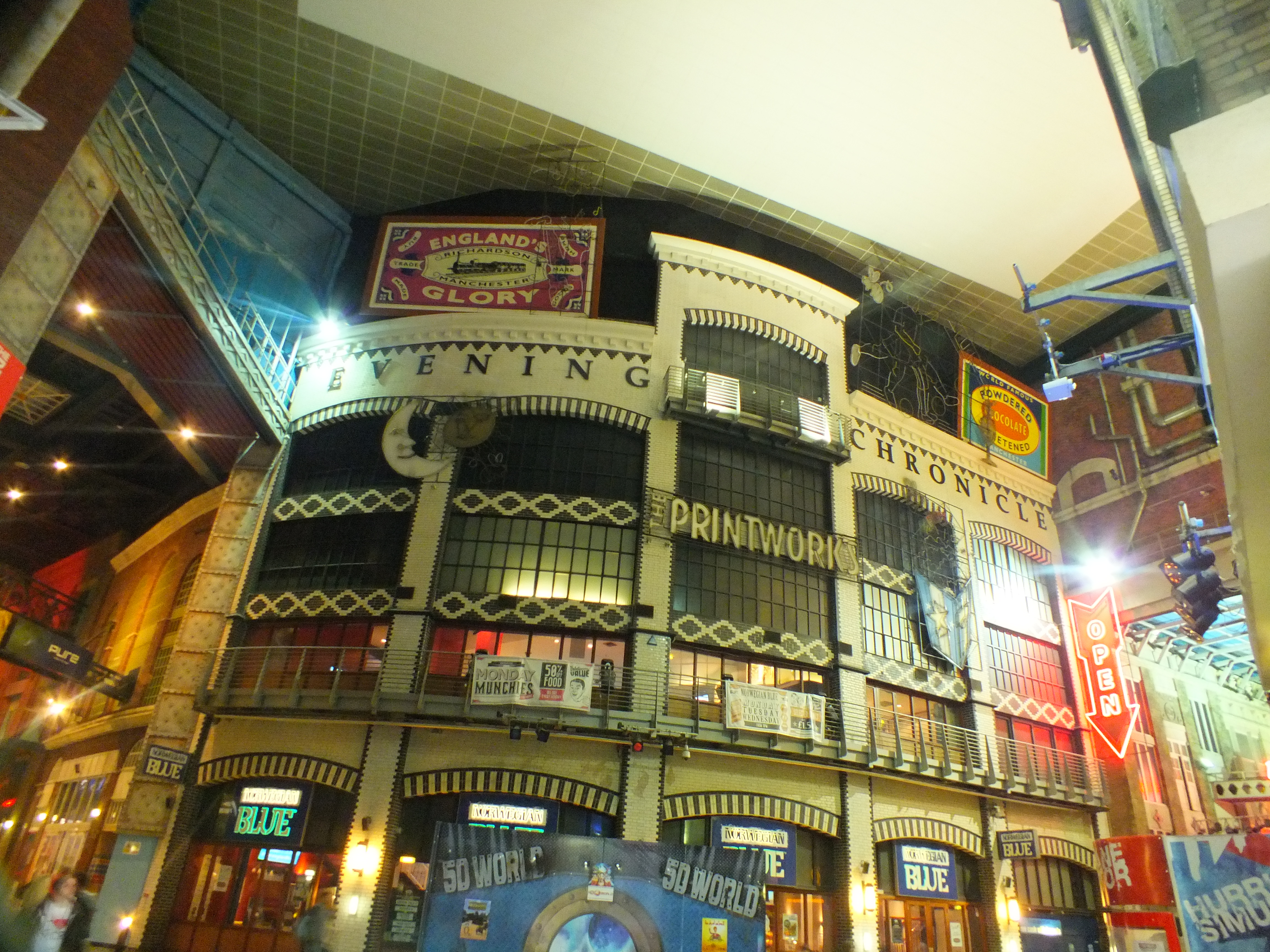
Interior detail of the Printworks, Manchester (Pre digital screen)

Printworks is an urban entertainment complex on the corner of Withy Grove and Corporation Street in Manchester city centre, UK. It sits in close proximity to Exchange Square, Manchester Arndale and Manchester Victoria railway station.

It currently contains a large cinema, bars, restaurants and nightclubs — alongside a bowling alley, arcade, mini golf and a health centre.

== Current occupants ==
As of July 2025 the occupants of Printworks are as follows:

=== Entertainment and health ===
- Boom Battle Bar
- Vue Cinema & IMAX
- Tenpin
- Treetop Golf
- Nuffield Health

=== Food and drink ===
- Bierkeller
- Big Licks
- Chiquito
- Dave's Hot Chicken
- Hard Rock Cafe
- Nando's
- O'Neils
- Tank & Paddle
- Wagamama
- Walkabout
- Wetherspoons
- City Sweets

== Original Printworks ==
The existing Printworks entertainment venue is located on the revamped Withy Grove site of the business premises of the 19th-century newspaper proprietor Edward Hulton, established in 1873 and later expanded. Hulton's son Sir Edward Hulton expanded his father's newspaper interests and sold his publishing business based in London and Manchester to Lord Beaverbrook and Lord Rothermere when he retired in 1923. Most of the Hulton newspapers were sold again soon afterwards to the Allied Newspapers consortium formed in 1924 (renamed Kemsley Newspapers in 1943 and bought by Roy Thomson in 1959).

Earlier names of the buildings associated with publishing that were incorporated into the development include Withy Grove Printing House, the Chronicle Buildings, Allied House, Kemsley House, Thomson House and Maxwell House. Kemsley House on the corner of Withy Grove and Corporation Street was developed gradually from 1929 and became the largest newspaper printing house in Europe. The site housed a printing press until 1988. Robert Maxwell bought the property and subsequently closed it down. The building was left unused for over a decade and fell derelict.

== Redevelopment ==
The property was subsequently redeveloped and reopened as a leisure centre as part of the redevelopment of Manchester following the 1996 IRA bombing.

We placed a very strong emphasis on developing cultural and entertainment opportunities to broaden the interest and attraction of the city centre. We saw the Shudehill site as a prime location for a large regional leisure and entertainment facility. It will add massively to the diversity of the area, its attractiveness as a place to visit and will enhance its competitive edge.

— Sir Richard Leese, leader of Manchester City Council

In 1998, the derelict building and surrounding site were bought for £10 million by Shudehill Developments, a joint venture by Co-operative Wholesale Society and Co-operative Insurance Society which owned buildings and land adjacent to the building. The building was renamed Printworks reflecting its past history and underwent a £110 million conversion to transform the property into an entertainment venue. The frontage Pevsner describes as a "weakly Baroque Portland stone façade" was retained, and part of an internal railway from the newspaper business and its turntable for transporting newspapers was incorporated into the new floor.

In 2000, Printworks was opened by Sir Alex Ferguson and Lionel Richie as the venue for a variety of clubs, leisure facilities and eateries.

In 2024 The Printworks underwent a £27m improvement project, with the roof of the enclosed "street" replaced with a 1,000 sqm. "Digital Ceiling" The original exterior Portland stone facade on Corporation Street and Withy Grove was also heavily remodelled, with signage now consisting primarily of LED screens located above the roof-line.

== Vue Cinema & IMAX ==
The Printworks is home to a twenty-screen cinema complex set over three storeys, currently operated by Vue since 2017. The complex, originally operated as 'thefilmworks' by UCI, followed by Odeon, was fitted with an IMAX screen upon opening in November 2000. The screen measures 26.3m x 18.8m with a 1.43:1 aspect ratio, making it the 2nd largest in the UK. It was one of 30 screens worldwide to show Christopher Nolan's "Oppenheimer" on 70mm film.

In 2018 the screen was upgraded to support laser projection whilst retaining its ability to screen 70mm film. During this refurbishment all other 19 screens had seating replaced with recliners, with IMAX (Screen 1) seating replaced with semi-recliners reducing the number of seats to 345.

== Tenpin & Treetop Golf ==
In 2018 "Treetop Golf" opened on the first floor of Printworks with its entrance located to the rear of the complex on Dantzic Street. It consists of two 18-hole mini golf courses themed to the amazon rainforest alongside a cafe and bar.

In 2020 a Tenpin bowling alley and arcade opened in the basement of the complex, with its entrance located on the corner of Dantzic Street and Balloon Street. It contains 12 bowling lanes, an arcade, a karaoke parlour and other games such as pool, shuffleboard and beer pong. Also included are two bars and an American-style diner.

== Ownership ==
The property was sold to Resolution Property for £100 million in 2008, and was sold again to Land Securities for £93.9 million in 2012. In 2017 DZT Investors acquired the property.
