= T. E. Dunville =

English entertainer

- Signed photo
- Born: Thomas Edward Wallen; 29 July 1867; Coventry, England
- Died: 21 March 1924 (aged 56); Caversham Lock at Reading, Berkshire, England
- Occupation: Music hall comedian
- Years active: 1880s–1924
- Spouses: Fanny Warriss (1895–1902, divorced); Dora Cross (1909–1924, Dunville's death)

T. E. Dunville (born Thomas Edward Wallen; 29 July 1867 – 21 March 1924) was a leading English music hall comedian, described by Charlie Chaplin as "an excellent funny man".

== Life and career ==
Thomas Edward Wallen was born at 32 New Street, Coventry, England on 29 July 1867, the son of a tailor. He was educated at Bablake School, and worked briefly for the bicycle manufacturer Rudge-Whitworth. He took his stage name from the whisky firm Dunville & Co.

At first he worked in an acrobatic troupe, "The Merry Men", and then in pantomimes. Having established himself in the northern music halls, Dunville took his act to London in 1890, performing first at the Middlesex Music Hall in Drury Lane. He was billed as an "eccentric comedian and contortionist". His appearance accounted for the "eccentric" part: he had a high forehead, and wore a black wig with a wide parting on the left; he wore a loose black jacket with large buttons, tight black trousers, and large boots. A disabled arm contributed to the "contortionist" part: the arm would jerk and swing with a life of its own as he performed an eccentric dance.

He used the same trademark costume irrespective of the character he was portraying, with "no element of realism". He performed in a staccato style, with songs and verses such as "And the Verdict Was", the chorus of which comprised four short lines such as "Little boy/ Pair of skates/ Broken ice/ Heaven's gates". The music hall historian Harold Scott described Dunville as having "a measure of comic genius..."

Dunville's first wife, Fanny Warriss, attempted, with Dunville's support, a singing career on the music hall stage under the name Millie Lindon.

Dunville's autobiography, The Autobiography of an Eccentric Comedian, was published by Everett & Co. in 1912.

== Death ==
Remaining successful for more than thirty years, Dunville gave his last performance at the Grand Theatre, Clapham on 20 March 1924. The following day he disappeared, and on 22 March 1924 his body was found in the River Thames at Caversham Lock near Reading. Dunville had suffered with depression for several years, and he left his (second) wife, Dora, a suicide note including the words "I feel I cannot bear it any longer." He is buried near Bridport in Dorset, in a grave marked with a white cross bearing the words "Jesus wept".

== Recordings ==
Dunville recorded five phonograph cylinders:

- "Enquire Within" (Edison cylinder 13023)
- "Nine Gallant Highlanders" (Edison cylinder 13024)
- "Scoot" (Edison cylinder 13025)
- "The Volunteer Fireman" (Edison cylinder 13036)
- "The Three Stages of Women" (Edison cylinder 13037)

Made on the earliest commercial medium for recording and reproducing sound, the recordings may have disintegrated:

"There is now a very real danger that T.E. Dunville's cylinders no longer exist - if any of them do turn up they should be committed to tape or microgroove as soon as possible, the fragility of wax cylinders making such a step particularly necessary. Should they have parted company with their original boxes, the only identification on the cylinders themselves may well be the Edison serial number ... would anyone knowing of the existence of any Dunville cylinders please arrange for them to be transferred electrically to a more permanent "record". How tragic it would be if the voice of one of the premier examples of the "eccentric comedian" were allowed to slip into oblivion."

== Legacy ==
P. G. Wodehouse refers to Dunville in his 1909 comic novel The Swoop! (Part Two, Chapter Four).

Dunville created a style of movement called "leg mania", which influenced later comic performers including Max Wall and Billy Dainty. There is a small display dedicated to Dunville at the Coventry Music Museum.
