= Daily Record (Scotland) =

Scottish tabloid newspaper

- Scotland's champion

- Front page, 16 December 2025
- Type: Daily newspaper
- Format: Tabloid
- Owner: Reach plc
- Editor: Neil McIntosh
- Founded: 1895; 131 years ago
- Headquarters: Glasgow, Scotland
- Circulation: 38,854 (as of September 2025)
- Sister newspapers: Sunday Mail
- ISSN: 0956-8069
- OCLC number: 500344244
- Website: dailyrecord.co.uk

The Daily Record is a Scottish national tabloid newspaper based in Glasgow. The newspaper is published Monday–Saturday and its website is updated on an hourly basis, seven days a week. The Record's sister title is the Sunday Mail. Both are owned by Reach plc and have a close kinship with the UK-wide Daily Mirror.

The Record covers UK news and sport with a Scottish focus. The newspaper was at the forefront of technological advances in publishing throughout the 20th century and became the first European daily newspaper to be produced in full colour.

As the Record's print circulation has declined in line with other national papers, it has focused increasing attention on expanding its digital news operation.

Neil McIntosh was announced as the latest editor of the Daily Record in August 2025.

== Foundation and early history ==
The Daily Record was first published in 1895 in Glasgow as a sister title to the North British Daily Mail.

The Mail – which was not linked to the London-based newspaper of the same name – was the first daily newspaper to be published in Glasgow when launched in 1847. It was among the first papers to offer readers in Scotland the latest political and business news direct from London. Publishers based outside the UK capital were then reliant on correspondents sending information in the post, which could take days to arrive.

The rapid expansion of the British railway network in the 1840s revolutionised the postal service as letters could now be sent from London to Scotland overnight, making daily newspapers produced outside of the south-east commercially viable.

Sir Charles Cameron, one of the most celebrated Scottish journalists of his day, became editor of the Mail in 1864 and oversaw its expansion.

By 1895 Glasgow was a global industrial centre and its population was approaching one million. The Daily Record was launched to meet the increasing appetite for reading material and also to take advantage of the huge demand for advertising space from the city's booming commercial sector.

The Record was a product of the Amalgamated Press company established by Alfred Harmsworth, the press baron who would become Lord Northcliffe. The paper was first printed at a factory in Frederick Lane.

The daily edition of the Mail ceased publication in 1901 and was incorporated into the Record, which was renamed the Daily Record and Mail. The separate Sunday Mail continued publication and survives to this day.

In 1904, the paper's growing success was reflected when the Record moved into a purpose-built headquarters at Renfield Lane in Glasgow city centre. The five-storey building was designed by the eminent Scottish architect Charles Rennie Mackintosh.

Charles Mackintosh wanted to maximise light in the poorly-lit lane and adopted a striking use of colour on the exterior, combining yellow sculpted sandstone with blue and white glazed reflective bricks. The lower floors were used for newspaper production while the upper levels were used by editorial and commercial staff.

Lord Kemsley bought the Daily Record, Sunday Mail and another newspaper, the Glasgow Evening News, for £1 million in 1922. He formed a controlling company known as Associated Scottish Newspapers Ltd. Larger premises were required for the three titles and production was switched from the Mackintosh building to a new building at 67 Hope Street in 1926.

The Record, Sunday Mail and Evening News were all sold to the London-based Mirror Group in 1955. Glasgow was by then still served by three evening newspapers, despite the city's population having peaked. The Evening News was closed in January 1957.

Production of the Record and Sunday Mail moved to a purpose-built office and printing plant at Anderston Quay in 1971.

== Innovation ==
The Record made British newspaper history on 7 October 1936 by publishing the first colour advertisement seen in a daily title – a full page advertising Dewar's White Label Whisky. It took some time for colour advertisements to become popular across other newspapers as printing techniques of the time could lead to smudging.

In June 1936, the Record also published what was hailed as the first colour photograph to accompany a news story when the paper printed an image of then-exiled Ethiopian emperor Haile Selassie upon his visit to the west of Scotland, where he stayed at Castle Wemyss.

In 1971 the Daily Record became the first European newspaper to be printed in "full colour" and was the first British national title to introduce computer page make-up technology. This was made by possible by the opening of a purpose-built printing plant at Anderston Quay on the River Clyde.

The switch to colour printing was overseen by editor Derek Webster and saw the paper's circulation jump to 750,000 copies per day. Printers from around the world, including a team from Asahi Shimbun in Japan, visited the Record's Glasgow plant to learn about the potential of the new printing press.

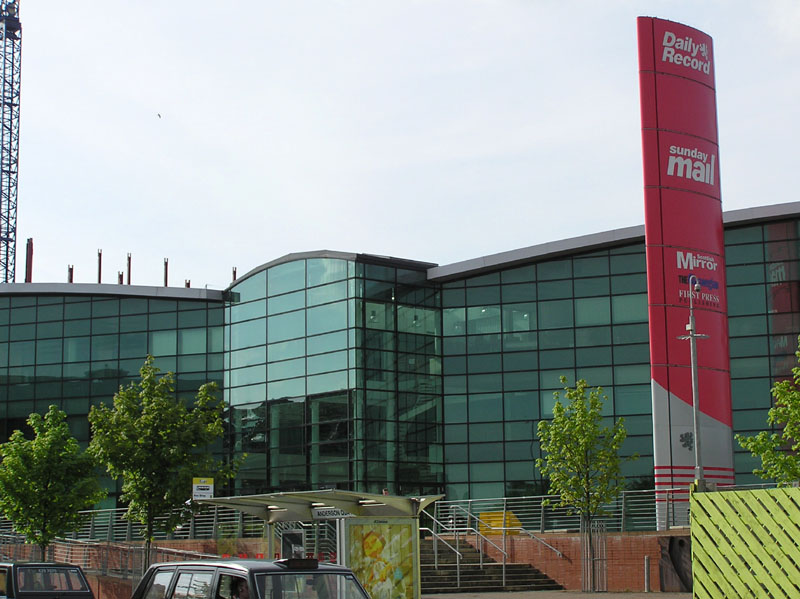
The Daily Record building at Central Quay, Glasgow, opened in 1999

== Circulation wars ==
By the time of the UK general election of 1970, the Daily Record was described as one of "the two best-selling Scottish newspapers" along with the Scottish edition of the Daily Express.

The post-war years were a time of intense competition among daily newspapers across the UK to attract both readers and lucrative advertising business. The competition was particularly fierce among the Scottish press, which served a country with an above average number of papers despite a population of just over five million.

The rivalry between the Record and the Express to be first to publish exclusive stories was at its height during the 1960s and 1970s, an era when most London-based newspapers had yet to establish themselves in Scotland.

The Scottish edition of the rival Express was drastically scaled back with large job losses in 1974, by which time the Record had become the biggest-selling newspaper in Scotland.

The Record's dominance of the daily newspaper market was challenged when Rupert Murdoch launched a well-funded Scottish edition of The Sun in 1987. The new title's launch editor was Jack Irvine, who was poached from the Record by Murdoch.

In 2006 the Scottish edition of The Sun claimed to have finally over taken the Record in terms of print copies being sold each day. This was the result of aggressive cost-cutting, which saw the Sun sold for just 10p per copy – half the cost of the Record at the time.

The Record and its sister title, the Sunday Mail, were purchased by Trinity Mirror in 1999, from the estate of Robert Maxwell.

== Circulation ==
Year (period)	Average circulation per issue
2005 (October)	454,427
2010 (January)	323,831
2012 (May)	281,465
2015 (May)	193,907
2016 (December)	160,557
2017 (January)	155,772
2019 (June)	111,524
2019 (December)	104,906
2021 (January)	85,769
2022 (January)	75,696
2023 (February)	61,117
2024 (February)	52,264

== Archive ==
Historical copies of the Daily Record from its launch in 1895 until 1999 are available to search and view in digitised form at the British Newspaper Archive.

== Daily Record PM ==
In August 2006, the paper launched afternoon editions in Glasgow and Edinburgh entitled Record PM. Both papers initially had a cover price of 15p, but in January 2007, it was announced that they would become freesheets, which are distributed on the streets of the city centres. It was simultaneously announced that new editions were to be released in Aberdeen and Dundee. The PM is no longer published by the Daily Record.

== Political stance ==
The Record endorsed Harold Wilson ahead of the 1964 general election and supported Labour at every subsequent national election for the next forty years. The paper has taken a much more critical stance towards the party in the 21st century, coinciding with Labour's decline as an electoral force in Scotland.

The paper is a vigorous promoter of Scottish industries and associated trade unions. It was particularly critical of Margaret Thatcher during her premiership and blamed Conservative Party economic policies for the closure of numerous factories, shipyards and foundries throughout Scotland in the 1980s and 1990s.

The Record campaigned doggedly to save the Ravenscraig steel works, a major employer in the west of Scotland, and organised a mass petition of support which was in turn handed in at Downing Street. The plant was ultimately closed in 1992.

Like its sister title the Mirror, the Record opposed the Conservative Party under the premiership of Boris Johnson.

The Record backed Labour's policy of creating a Scottish Parliament, despite opposition from the then Conservative Government, throughout the 1980s and 1990s. The paper advocated for a "Yes-Yes" vote at the 1997 devolution referendum.

The Record was opposed to the Scottish National Party (SNP) and both Scottish independence and urged voters to stick with Labour at the 2007 Holyrood election, which the party lost by one seat.

At the 2021 Scottish Parliament election, the Record accepted the SNP would emerge as the largest party in terms of seats. It called on Nicola Sturgeon to work with Labour if she failed to win an outright majority.

Regarding the prospect of a second Scottish independence referendum, the paper said in a pre-election editorial: "If the people of Scotland vote for parties that support another referendum, that is what should happen."

The Record has campaigned for the decriminalisation of drug use in Scotland since 2019. In several special editions, it spoke to doctors, politicians, academics, recovery groups and former drug addicts, of whom the overwhelming majority advocate treating drugs as a health matter rather than a criminal one. The paper states that criminal convictions inappropriately punish drug users for their addictions, handing down fines they cannot afford to pay or custodial sentences that make their drug problems worse. The paper has also highlighted the use of drug consumption facilities, stating that they encourage addicts into treatment, reduce the amount of heroin needles on city pavements, counter the spread of diseases such as HIV and ultimately save lives. However, it stated that there would need to be changes to current law in the UK, such as decriminalising the bringing in of certain drugs to these facilities, before it would be possible to open and effectively run such facilities. The paper said that the biggest route to progress is through properly funding harm reduction and rehab programmes.

== Editors ==
1937–1946: Clem Livingstone
1946–1955: Alastair M. Dunnett
1955–1967: Alex Little
1967–1984: Derek Webster
1984–1988: Bernard Vickers
1988–1994: Endell Laird
1994–1998: Terry Quinn
1998–2000: Martin Clarke
2000–2003: Peter Cox
2003–2011: Bruce Waddell
2011–2014: Allan Rennie
2014–2018: Murray Foote
2018–: David Dick

== See also ==
- List of newspapers in Scotland
- List of newspapers in the United Kingdom by circulation
- Scottish Daily News
