= Ten Entertainment Group =

British bowling centre operator

Coordinates: 51.4210°N 0.2079°W

Ten Entertainment Group PLC
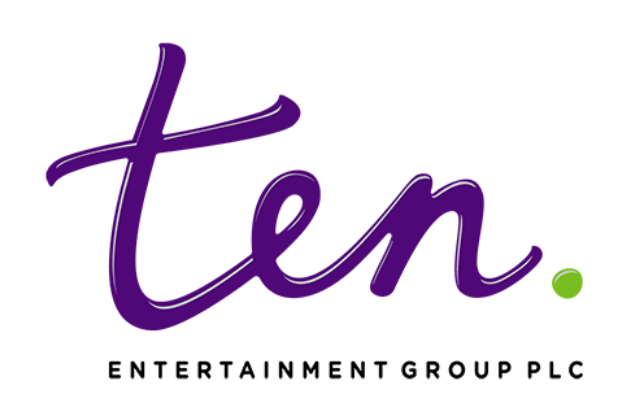
- Company type: Public
- Traded as: LSE: TEG
- Industry: Bowling
- Founded: May 2009
- Headquarters: Aragon House Cranfield Technology Park, Cranfield Bedford, United Kingdom
- Website: tegplc.co.uk

Ten Entertainment Group, formerly Essenden, is a British public company that operates ten-pin bowling centres under the Tenpin brand. It is one of the largest bowling companies in the UK, with around 17% of the market. The head office is at Aragon House Cranfield Technology Park, Bedford.

== History ==
The company was formed on 22 May 2009 as Essenden, following a scheme of arrangement proposed by the directors of Georgica plc, which had trading difficulties at the time. Rory Macnamara was the chairman, and Nick Basing the chief executive. The shares were traded on London's Alternative Investment Market, under the ticker ESS. The Company had loan notes which were freely transferable and were listed on PLUS Markets.

The company was taken private in 2015 by Harwood Capital, then returned to the market as Ten Entertainment Group in 2017.
