= Millie Lindon =

English music hall singer and socialite

- Born: Fanny Elizabeth Warriss; 1 April 1869; Small Heath, Birmingham, England
- Died: 11 March 1940 (aged 70); Taormina, Sicily, Italy
- Other names: Florence Elizabeth Millicent Warriss; Lady Hulton; Baroness Otto Sklenář von Schaniel
- Occupations: Singer, socialite

Millie Lindon (born Fanny Elizabeth Warriss, 1 April 1869 – 11 March 1940) was an English music hall singer and socialite. According to cultural historian Richard Anthony Baker, her life was the "most astounding example of social re-invention" among music hall performers who, previously, had been "regarded socially as the lowest of the low".

== Biography ==
She was born in Small Heath, Birmingham, the daughter of a tailor, John H. Warriss and his wife, born Frances Millicent Lindon. She was a cousin of the Rudge Sisters. Although some sources suggest her year of birth was 1878, official records show that she was born in 1869. She began working in music halls under the name Millie Lindon (a version of her mother's maiden name), and in 1895 married another music hall performer, the "eccentric comedian and contortionist" T. E. Dunville (Thomas Edward Wallen), who then managed her career. At the time of their marriage, she used the name Florence Elizabeth Millicent Warriss, and understated her age by several years. Her most popular song was "For Old Times' Sake", a sentimental song written by Charles Osborne, in 1898, but her professional career was relatively short and unremarkable. She and Dunville divorced in 1902; he later killed himself.

In 1906 and 1909, she had two children with newspaper owner, Edward Hulton, the founder of the Daily Sketch, who was himself married at the time. Hulton and Minnie Lindon, who at that point used the name Miss Warris-Lindon, married in 1916, but he died in 1925. She claimed to their son, the publisher Edward George Warris Hulton, that she was descended from an aristocratic Spanish family, de Warris. In his autobiography, he gave a vivid account of her lifestyle – "In the morning, she spent an hour or two making up her face, ate an enormous breakfast, wrote letters and pottered about among her rococo furniture before driving to lunch. She was well known at all the fashionable restaurants of the day, such as Quaglino's." He also referred to a succession of her "gentleman friends", including a former president of Peru, a Uruguayan colonel, and a military man who she claimed was the original "Galloping Major" of the popular song.

After Edward Hulton's death, she married Major General John Thompson in 1928; the couple divorced in 1937. She then married a Czech nobleman, Baron Otto Sklenář von Scaniel, in 1938. She died in Taormina, Sicily, in 1940. Her remains were returned to England, and she was buried at Putney Vale Cemetery.
