= Sunday Chronicle =

British newspaper

- Type: Weekly newspaper
- Owner(s): Edward Hulton (senior) (1884–1904); Edward Hulton (1904–1924); Allied Newspapers (1924–1955)
- Founder: Edward Hulton (senior)
- Editor: James Drawbell (1925–1946)
- Founded: August 1885 in Manchester
- Ceased publication: 1955; merged into Empire News
- Headquarters: Manchester (1885–1924); London (1924–1955)

The Sunday Chronicle was a newspaper in the United Kingdom, published from 1885 to 1955.

The newspaper was founded in Manchester by Edward Hulton in August 1885. He was known for his sporting coverage, already publishing the Sporting Chronicle, the Daily Dispatch and the Athletic News. The paper initially cost one penny and, despite its name, was published on both Saturdays and Sundays.

The socialist Robert Blatchford worked for the paper in its early years and, owing to his influence, it supported the Manningham Mills strikers. However, Blatchford was sacked immediately after the strike and instead founded the Clarion with the paper's drama critic, Alexander M. Thompson.

Hulton's son, also Edward Hulton, took over the business on his father's death, but sold it to Allied Newspapers in 1924 for £6 million. Publication was moved to London, and James Drawbell was appointed editor, positioning it as a middle market newspaper and increasing circulation.

In 1955 the Chronicle was merged into the Empire News. The Empire News itself disappeared in 1960 when it was merged with the Sunday Times.

== Editors ==
Thomas Harris
A. W. Woodbridge
1925: James Drawbell
1946:
1950: Gordon McKenzie
1952: John William Robertson
1954: Anthony Berry
1954: Eugene Romer Wason
