= Athletic News =

Manchester-based newspaper

- Type: Weekly
- Founder: Edward Hulton
- Founded: 1875
- Ceased publication: 1931
- Headquarters: Manchester
- Sister newspapers: Sporting Chronicle; Sunday Chronicle

The Athletic News and Cyclists' Journal was a Manchester-based newspaper founded by Edward Hulton in 1875. It was published weekly, covering weekend sports fixtures other than horse racing, which was already covered by the Sporting Chronicle founded by Hulton in 1871. It was an advocate of professional football and many of its staff were actively involved in the sport.

In 1931 it merged with the Sporting Chronicle's Monday edition. The original name was preserved until the 1940s in the titles of the Athletic News Football Annual first issued in 1887 and the Athletic News Cricket Annual first issued in 1888; both these annuals were eventually taken over by the Sunday Chronicle, founded by Hulton in 1885.
