= American pool =

Type of pocket billiards

American pool is a term used in the United Kingdom, and sometimes more broadly outside North America, to refer to pool (pocket billiards) cue sports that make use of formerly American-style and now professionally world-standardised numbered billiard balls that have a standard diameter of 57 mm (2 1/4 in), as opposed to British-style unnumbered 56 mm (2 3/16 in) balls. Other "American" pool differences from British-style pool include larger pockets to accommodate the bigger balls, and diamond system markings on the rails.

The term may apply to any pool game variety using such a ball set, and is commonly applied especially to the most internationally competitive of these sports:

- Eight-ball, the most commonly played form of pool (as distinct from blackball, a.k.a. British eightball pool)
- Nine-ball, the leading professional variant of pool, with historical roots in the United States in the 1920s
- Ten-ball, a rotation game very similar to nine-ball, but more difficult, using ten balls instead of nine, and played called-shot
- Straight pool (a.k.a. 14.1 continuous), formerly the common sport of championship competition until overtaken by faster-playing games like nine-ball
- One-pocket, an extremely challenging game in which each player must make all shots into a single pocket.

== See also ==
- Cue sports#Pool (pocket billiards) games, a longer list of notable games to which this term may be applied
