= Empire News =

British newspaper

- Type: Weekly newspaper
- Owner(s): Edward Hulton (1917–1923); Allied Newspapers (1924–1959)
- Founder: H. S. Jennings
- Founded: 1884 in Manchester
- Ceased publication: 1960; merged into The Sunday Times

The Empire News was a Sunday newspaper in the United Kingdom. The newspaper was founded in 1884 in Manchester as The Umpire. A penny newspaper, it was the first successful provincial Sunday newspaper in England. Owned by H. S. Jennings, The Umpire was subtitled "A Sporting, Athletic, Theatrical and General Newspaper", and focused on sports and theatre news. In 1894, it absorbed the former daily newspaper, the Manchester Examiner and Times.

In 1917, Edward Hulton bought the paper and renamed it the Empire, and shortly after, the Empire News. Along with Hulton's other papers, the News was acquired by Lord Beaverbrook and then sold to Lord Rothermere, later becoming part of Allied Northern Newspapers and later Kemsley Newspapers.

The paper was renamed the Sunday Empire News in 1944, but in 1950 became the Empire News and the Umpire and in 1953 was back to being the Empire News. In 1955, the Sunday Chronicle was merged with the Empire News, and the paper's title became the Empire News and the Sunday Chronicle.

Roy Thomson bought the paper in 1959 and merged it into The Sunday Times in 1960.

== Editors ==
1943: J. A. Woodbridge
1945: Norman Hamilton
1946:
1948: Terence Horsley
1949: George Grafton Green
1957: L. Harton
