= Mark Clapson =

British historian

Mark Clapson is a British social and cultural historian specialising in suburban history, the Blitz and working-class history. As of 2017, he is professor of social and cultural history at the University of Westminster.

== Career ==
Clapson graduated from Lancaster University with a Bachelor of Arts (BA) degree in 1982, and then received a Master of Arts (MA) degree in modern social history from the University the following year. In 1989, he was awarded a doctorate (PhD) from the University of Warwick, having successfully defended his thesis on gambling in England between 1823 and 1961.

Having taught at the Open University and the University of Bedfordshire, Clapson joined the University of Westminster in 2002; as of 2017, he is a Professor of Social and Cultural History there.

Clapson has also served on the Arts and Humanities Research Council Peer Review College, the Steering Committee of History UK and the Editorial Boards of Planning Perspectives, the University of Westminster Press and the Journal of Administrative Sciences.

== Research ==
Clapson's research has focused on the history of suburbia in England, as well as working-class and leisure history, and the history of the Blitz. According to a Research Excellence Framework case study, he "has challenged a powerful anti-suburban prejudice in popular and elite cultures in Britain, and sought to confront negative perceptions of the British new towns. His impact is international in reach." Clapson has focused on the intersection between planning policy and social change in an international context, arguing that Milton Keynes "was at the crossroads of an Anglo-American intellectual culture of town planning".

== Publications ==
=== Books ===
- A Bit of a Flutter: Popular Gambling and English Society, c. 1923-1961 (Manchester: Manchester University Press, 1992).
- Invincible Green Suburbs, Brave New Towns: Social Change and Urban Dispersal in Postwar England (Manchester: Manchester University Press, 1998).
- (with M. Dobbin and P. Waterman) The Best Laid Plans: Milton Keynes since 1967 (Luton: Luton University Press, 1998).
- A Century of Amusement Machines: Gaming in the Twentieth Century (London: BACTA, 2000).
- Suburban Century: Social Change and Urban Growth in England the USA (Oxford: Berg, 2003).
- A Social History of Milton Keynes: Middle England/Edge City (London: Taylor and Francis, 2004).
- The Routledge Companion to Britain in the Twentieth Century (London: Taylor and Francis, 2009).
- (editor; with R. Hutchinson), Suburbanisation in Global Society (Bingley Emerald, 2010).
- Working-Class Suburb: Social Change on an English Council Estate, 1930-2010 (Manchester: Manchester University Press, 2012).
- Anglo-American Crossroads: Urban Research and Planning in Britain, 1940-2010 (Bloomsbury, 2012).
- An Education in Sport: Competition, Communities and Identities at the University of Westminster since 1864 (Cambridge: Granta, 2012).
- (editor; with P. Larkham) The Blitz and its Legacy: Wartime Destruction to Postwar Reconstruction (Farnham: Ashgate, 2013).
- The Blitz Companion: Aerial Warfare, Civilians and The City since 1911 (London: University of Westminster Press, 2019).

=== Chapters ===
- "The London Labour Party and the LCC between the wars", in Saint, A. (ed.), Politics and the people of London: the London County Council, 1889-1965 (London: Hambledon Press, 1989), pp. 127–145.
- "Playing the system: the world of organised street betting in Manchester, Salford and Bolton, 1880-1939", in Davies, A. and Fielding, S. (ed.), Workers' Worlds: Cultures and Communities in Manchester and Salford, 1880-1939 (Manchester: Manchester University Press, 1992), pp. 156–178.
- "A bit of a flutter: off-course ready-money betting in England, 1853-1961", in Pullinger, K. (ed.), A Gambling Box (London: Redstone, 1992), pp. 78–85.
- "Gambling, 'the fancy', and Booth's role and reputation as a social investigator", in Englander, D., and O'Day, R. (ed.), Retrieved Riches: Social Investigation in Britain, 1840-1914 (Aldershot: Scolar Press, 1995), pp. 365–380.
- "Suburbanisation and social change in England and North America, 1870-1970", in Englander, D. (ed.), Britain and America: Studies in Comparative History, 1760-1970 (London and New York: Yale University Press, 1997), pp. 132–148.
- "Technology, social change, and the planning of a post-industrial city: a case study of Milton Keynes", in Goodman, D., and Chant, C. (ed.), European Cities and Technology: Industrial to Post-Industrial City (London: Routledge, 1999).
- (with C. Emsley) "Street, beat and respectability: the culture and self-image of the late Victorian and Edwardian policeman", in Knafla, L. A. (ed.), Policing and War in Europe (Westport, Connecticut: Greenwood Press, 2002).
- "Ni ville ni campagne: le banlieu et l'evolution sociale en Angleterre depuis 1945 [Neither town nor country: suburbanisation and social change in postwar England]", in Roudaut, E. (ed.), Villes et Campagnes Britanniques: Confrontation ou (Con)fusion? (Valenciennes: Presses universitaires de Valenciennes, 2003).
- Biographies of Joseph Coral (1904-1996), Alfred Cecil Critchley (1890-1963), Vernon Edmund Sangster (1899-1986) and Mirabel Dorothy Topham (1891-1980) in Oxford Dictionary of National Biography (Oxford: Oxford University Press, 2004).
- "Cities, suburbs, countryside", in Addison, P., and Jones, H., (ed.), A Companion to Contemporary Britain, 1939-2000 (Oxford: Blackwell, 2005), pp. 59-75.
- "Suburbanisation", in Hutchison, R. (ed.), Encyclopedia of Urban Studies (London and New York: Sage, 2010).
- "Introduction: the plan for Milton Keynes and its legacy", in The plan for Milton Keynes (London: Routledge, 2013).
- "Garden cities (cités jardins) et new towns (villes nouvelles) en Grande-Bretagne: quelques mots clés et noms d'une tradition anglo-américaine de planification urbaine", in Leimdorfer, F. (ed.), Dire les Villes Nouvelles (Paris: Éditions de la Maison des Sciences de l’Homme, 2014), pp. 47-69.
- "Looking back on the postwar British new towns: successes and failures in the state’s policy of decentralisation", in Nakano, T. (ed.), Urban Development and Housing in Twentieth-Century Europe and Japan: Historical Approaches and New Perspectives (Tokyo: Yamakawa, 2015), pp. 81-120.
- "From garden city to new town: social change, politics and town planners at Welwyn, 1920-1948", in Meller, H., and Porfyriou, H. (ed.), Planting New Towns in Europe in the Interwar Years: Experiments and Dreams for Future Societies (Cambridge: Cambridge Scholars Publishing, 2016).

=== Articles ===
- "The revival of the state lottery in Britain", Contemporary Record, vol. 8, issue 2 (1994), pp. 321-342.
- "Working class women's experiences of moving to new housing estates in England since 1919", Twentieth Century British History, vol. 10, issue 3 (1999), pp. 345-369.
- "The suburban aspiration in England since 1919", Contemporary British History, vol. 14, issue 1 (2000), pp. 151-173.
- "Suburban paradox? Planners' intentions and residents' preferences in two new towns of the 1960s: Reston, Virginia and Milton Keynes, England", Planning Perspectives, vol. 17, issue 2 (2002), pp. 145-162.
- "The American contribution to the urban sociology of race relations in Britain from the 1940s to the early 1970s", Urban History, vol. 33, issue 2 (2006), pp. 253-273.
- "Global sport in the suburbs: the Regent Street Polytechnic’s sports facilities at Chiswick, 1888–1938", London Journal, vol. 39, issue 3 (2014), pp. 265-280.
- "The rise and fall of Monica Felton, British town planner and peace activist, 1930s to 1950s", Planning Perspectives, vol. 30, issue 2 (2015), pp. 211-229.
- "The new suburban history, New Urbanism and the spaces in between", Urban History, vol. 43, issue 2 (2016), pp. 336–341.
