= Tipster =

Provider of sporting tips

A tipster is someone who regularly provides information (tips) on the likely outcomes of sporting events on internet sites or special betting places.

== History ==
In the past tips were bartered for and traded but nowadays, thanks largely to the Internet and premium rate telephone lines, they are usually exchanged for money, and many tipsters operate websites. Some of them are free and some require subscription.

In the past tipping was mostly associated with horse racing but can apply to any sport that has odds offered on it. The relaxed cultural attitude towards gambling in the UK is increasingly resulting in a gambling element being promoted alongside sport coverage in the media.

== System ==
A tip in gambling is a bet suggested by a third party who is perceived to be more knowledgeable about that subject than the bookmaker who sets the initial odds. (A bookmaker will vary his odds according to the amount of money wagered, but has to start with a blank book and himself set an initial price to encourage betting.) Thus a tip is not even regarded by the tipster as a certainty but that the bookmaker has set a price too low (or too high) from what the true risk is: it is a form of financial derivative, since the tipster himself risks none of his own money but sells his expert knowledge to others to try to "beat the bookie".

The tipster must overcome the profit margin integrated into sports betting odds by bookmakers trading teams and then also obtain an additional edge to deliver profit over the long term.

== Role ==
Tipsters are sometimes insiders of a particular sport able to provide bettors with information not publicly available. There are other tipsters who provide results through analysis of commonly accessible information.

Some tipsters use statistical based estimations about the outcome of a game, and compare this estimation with the bookmaker's odds. If there is a gap between the estimate odds and the bookmakers odds, the tipster is said to identify "value", and a person who bets on such odds when they perceive not a certainty but a "gap in the book" is said to be a "value bettor". When value is found, the tipster is recommending the bettor to place a bet.

A tip that is considered to be a racing certainty, that is, almost completely certain to be true, is also called a nap and tipsters in newspapers will tend to indicate the "nap".

== United Kingdom ==
=== Newspapers ===
Most National newspapers in the UK employ a tipster or columnist who provides horse racing tips. Rather than pick a tip for each race that occurs on a given day the normal protocol is to provide a Nap and nb selection.

Nap (derived from the card game Napoleon) indicates this is the tipster's most confident selection of the day.

nb = "Next best" and indicates another selection that the tipster rates highly.

Both types of selections would be counted in calculating the tipsters running profit/loss figure which states how far in profit or loss an individual would be if they had backed every tip with a level stake (£1).

=== Television ===
The popular Channel 4 television program The Morning Line, when it was on air up to 2016, previewed weekend horse racing on a Saturday morning culminating in the panel of experts and guests providing their selections for the day. 2017 saw ITV takeover UK horse racing coverage and they have a similar show to what Channel 4 had called "The Opening Show". It airs usually at 9.30am on Saturdays on ITV4 & is presented by Oli Bell. Sky Sports News runs a similar preview segment including expert analysis of the teams and betting odds relating to Premier League football fixtures on a Saturday.

=== Radio ===
For nearly fifty years the daily morning UK-wide Radio 4 Today program included a couple of racing tips in its short sports section (Garry Richardson was the usual presenter, although others filled in when he was away) but these were not taken too seriously (in fact the tips were supplied by a well-known newspaper tipster): but the program tracked Richardson's performance as a tipster for amusement value: he was usually quite well "down" but just very occasionally "up" after a correct tip at a long price. In 2024 the programmed dropped the tips as a daily feature, a few months before Richardson's retirement.

=== Scams ===
Premium tipping services charge a fee for accessing a tip or tips by telephone, internet or post. The more reputable companies will keep an accurate record of their tipping activities enabling a prospective client to assess their past form and so anticipate potential future performance. There is a lot of scope for less reputable operations to massage these figures or even to fabricate figures in order to attract new customers. In 2008, the Office of Fair Trading state the figure lost to tipster scams each year is between £1 million and £4 million in the UK alone. To mitigate the risks associated with unverified data, industry analysts emphasize the importance of independent performance tracking. Consequently, structured statistical audit models and standardized accuracy evaluation frameworks are frequently implemented to verify historical records and protect consumers from misleading claims.

Derren Brown's Channel 4 program The System exposed one method by which tipping services operate. By giving out different tips to different people (unknown to each other) in a horse race, one person must win (essentially, a sweepstake). The bettor who won might then assume that they received real insight into the race outcome from the tipster and may then pay for subsequent tips.

== Australia ==
Australia has led the way in the emergence of tipping competitions where the object is to win prizes for registering virtual bets. The focus of the majority of these competitions has been Australian rules football but the commonly referred to term for the activity of footy tipping now also covers soccer, Rugby League and Rugby Union. In the UK there are a growing number of such competitions but most relate to the horse racing industry.

In theory, tipping for prizes in a free competition provides a viable alternative to gambling for real. However, many will take the opposite view that it makes gambling more accessible to a wider audience by creating what is perceived to be a safe route in. There is also a lot of scope for gamblers looking to identify good tips using such competitions as an information resource given some competitions publish current tips entered and historical records for the tipsters involved.

== Internet ==
Internet forums are increasingly being used as a means to share ideas and information within web communities and many such forums exist in the gambling arena as a means of discussing views on events or simply offering advice and tips. While many in the gambling community view this as a way in which they can earn respect from their peers in an otherwise isolated profession, tipping services also use these areas to attract users to their premium schemes.

== Stocks and shares ==
While the term gambling is often considered to be confined to sports betting or at least the services offered by a bookmaker, the classification can also be applied to investing in stocks where the gamble relates to a share or commodity price moving in a certain direction. Stock tips, as publicised in the financial sections of the media, are largely directed at the casual investor but their interrelation and interest to the business sector has proven to be controversial.

The increase in spread betting as a financial derivative also blurs the distinction between financial investment and gambling: since in the United Kingdom a win on a bet pays no tax, but another form of investment might require payment of Capital Gains Tax, there may be a financial advantage to "betting".

=== Derivatives ===
Many newspapers and other betting journals such as the Racing Post track the leading newspapers' tipsters and see how well their predictions match the actual outcome, by assuming a nominal £1 bet on every tip that the tipster makes, and calculating the theoretical return. Thus, tipsters themselves can be "tipped" as being a good or bad tipster.

Therefore, it is actually possible in theory to bet on whether a tipster's prediction will be correct (rather than bet on the prediction itself).

== Other uses ==
Tipster is also a term used in the United Kingdom for a person who gives information regarding potential news stories, particularly those involving celebrities, to journalists, often in exchange for cash; or more generally an informant.
