= Wintour (surname) =

Wintour is a surname, and may refer to:

- Anna Wintour (born 1949), the editor-in-chief of American Vogue
- Charles Wintour (1917–1999), British publisher, father of Anna and Patrick
- Charles John Wintour (1871–1916), British Royal Navy officer
- Cordelia Mary Wintour (1912–2007), later Cordelia James, Baroness James of Rusholme, British educator and magistrate, sister of Charles
- Dave Wintour (1944–2022), British bass guitarist
- Fitzgerald Wintour (1860–1949), British military officer, father of Charles
- Marelyn Wintour-Coghlan, Australian physiologist
- Patrick Wintour (born 1954), political editor of The Guardian, son of Charles, brother of Anna
- Robert and Thomas Wintour (executed 1606), two of the leading members of the 1605 Gunpowder Plot
- Tranna Wintour, Canadian stand-up comedian

== See also ==
- Winter (surname)
- Wynter (surname)
