= Eliza Cook =

English author and poet (1818–1889)

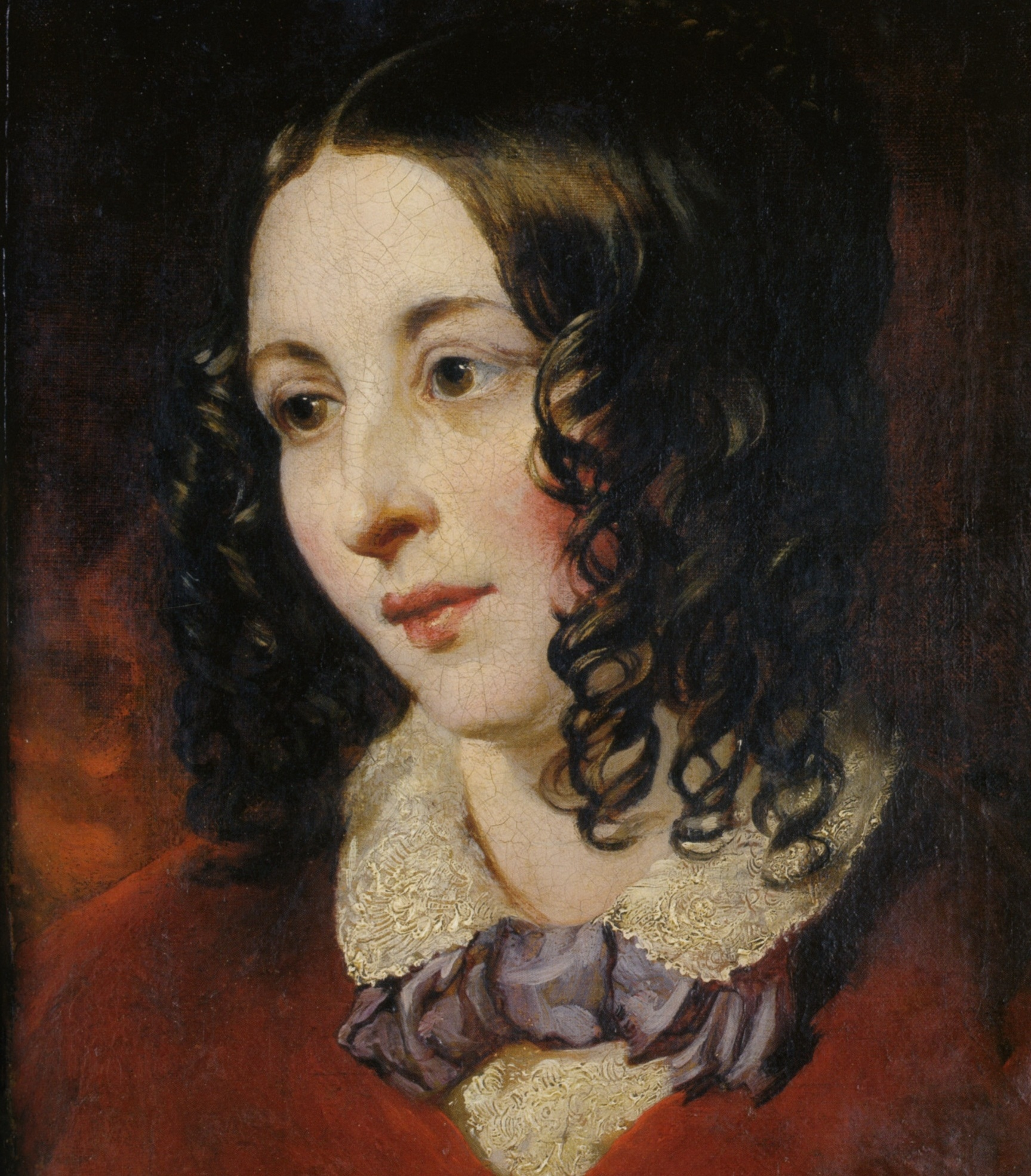
- Portrait by William Etty, c. 1845
- Born: 24 December 1818; London Road, Southwark, England
- Died: 23 September 1889 (aged 70); Wimbledon, England
- Resting place: St Mary's Church, Wimbledon
- Occupations: poet, activist
- Writing career
- Period: 1830s–1880s

Eliza Cook (24 December 1818 – 23 September 1889) was an English author and poet associated with the Chartist movement. She was a proponent of political freedom for women, and believed in the ideology of self-improvement through education, something she called "levelling up." This made her hugely popular with the working class public in both England and America.

== Childhood ==
Eliza Cook was the youngest of the eleven children of a brazier (a brass-worker) living in London Road, Southwark, where she was born. When she was about nine years old her father retired from business, and the family went to live at a small farm in St. Leonard's Forest, near Horsham. Her mother encouraged Eliza's fondness for imaginative literature, and despite attending the local Sunday school the child was almost entirely self-educated. At Sunday School she was encouraged by the music master's son to produce her first volume of poetry. She began to write verses before she was fifteen, contributing to the Weekly Dispatch and New Monthly, and published her first poetry collection two years later; indeed, some of her most popular poems, such as "I'm afloat" and the "Star of Glengarry," were composed in her girlhood.

== Career ==
Eliza Cook writing, c. 1860s

Cook's first volume of poetry, Lays of a Wild Harp, appeared in 1835, when she was only seventeen. Encouraged by its favourable reception, she began to send verses anonymously to the Weekly Dispatch, the Metropolitan Magazine, the New Monthly Magazine, and The Literary Gazette; William Jerdan praised her work in the last of these. After a time she confined herself to the radical Weekly Dispatch, where her first contribution had appeared under the signature 'C.' on 27 Nov 1836, and she became a staple of its pages for the next ten years. Its editor was William Johnson Fox and its owner was James Harmer, a London alderman. She lived for a time at Harmer's residence, Ingress Abbey, in Greenhithe, Kent, and wrote certain of her works there.

Cook's poem The Old Armchair (1838) made hers a household name for a generation, both in England and the United States. In that year, she also published Melaia and other Poems.

Her work for the Dispatch and New Monthly was pirated by George Julian Harney, the Chartist, for the Northern Star. Familiar with the London Chartist movement in its various sects, she followed many of the older radicals in disagreeing with the O'Brienites and O'Connorites in their disregard for the repeal of the Corn Laws. She also preferred the older Radicals' path of Friendly Societies and self-education.

From 1849 to 1854 Cook wrote, edited, and published Eliza Cook's Journal, a weekly periodical she described as one of "utility and amusement." The periodical was described as having "variety, piquancy, benevolent aim, and hardly had a superior" in comparison to other periodicals of the time. Although some found solace in Cook's work, the periodical was short lived due to lack of appreciation among the majority. After a struggle to keep the periodical afloat and through health issues the periodical ultimately fell.

Cook went on to publish Jottings from my Journal (1860), where a lot of Eliza Cook's Journal's contents reappeared. This publication was one of the few times Cook wrote in prose. It included many essays and sketches that were written in a clear and simple manner, usually conveying a moral lesson for the reader. Some of the essays are "mild satires on the social failings of her contemporaries."

She also published New Echoes and Other Poems (1864) which did not find as much success as her previous efforts. Despite a lack of interest in her later works, Eliza Cook was a staple of anthologies throughout the nineteenth century.

== Views ==
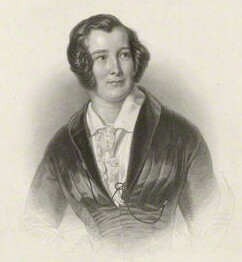
This portrait of Cook shows her "boyish" hair and "mannish appearance;" c. 1850s

Cook was a Chartist, one of "a body of 19th century English political reformers advocating better social and industrial conditions for the working classes." The goal of Chartist poetry is to create a sense of camaraderie for the people within a vast community who found themselves oppressed and suffering.

In her poem "A Song for the Workers," Cook emphasises the importance of shorter working hours. Within this poem she goes on to compare the treatment of labourers to that of the slaves in the United States. In another poem, "Our Father," Cook speaks out against child labour at the time and once again compares child labour to slavery. She also implies how children working such vigorous jobs turn their brains "dull and torpid," engaged in hard tasks that do not allow them to be children.

Along with these views Cook was a proponent of political and sexual freedom for women, and believed in the ideology of self-improvement through education, something she called "levelling up." This made her a favourite with the working-class public.

Not much is known about Cook's view on sexuality; however, through speculation, some researchers have inferred that Eliza Cook and some of her readers were lesbian. Her peers described her as having short "boyish" hair, a "mannish appearance," and mentioned that she wore lapelled jackets which showed off her shirt front and ruffles, described as "a very masculine style, which was considered strange at the time."

== Later life ==
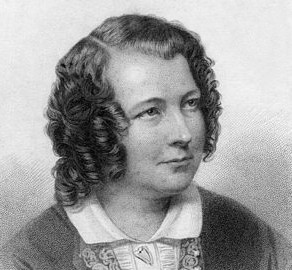
Engraved portrait of Eliza Cook, 1870

Cook was a close friend and lover of the American actress Charlotte Cushman. Cook and Cushman sometimes wore matching dresses to symbolise their friendship and "difference from heterosexual women."

On 18 June 1863, Eliza Cook received a Civil List pension of £100 a year. Afterwards she published only a few poems in the Weekly Dispatch, and quickly became what was described as a "confirmed invalid." Despite her loss in popularity, she still collected royalties from her publishers almost up to the end of her life. In the 1870 census she is recorded as living at Beech House, 23 Thornton Hill, Wimbledon, Surrey, along with a maid, Mary A. Bowles, her sister Mary Fyall, nephew Alfred Pyall, his wife Harriet, and their daughters Mary and Jane.

Cook's ill health prevented her writing. After many years of suffering on and off from illness she died at her home at Beech House on 23 September 1889. Cook's personal estate was £5,957 9s, and her will was proved by her brother Charles Cook and her nephew Alfred, still a resident of Beech House. She is buried at St. Mary's Church, Wimbledon.

== Works ==
- The Fair Rose of Killarney – A Ballad – By Miss Eliza Cook – Music by Stephen Glover (New-York Mirror Saturday 29 June 1839 pp 32)
- Her article "People Who Do Not Like Poetry" (May 1849) can be found in the book A Serious Occupation: Literary Criticism by Victorian Women Writers ISBN 1-55111-350-3.
- Poems (1859, poems)
- "The Heart That's True" was set to music in 1857 by Australian composer George Tolhurst
