= Lord Matthews =

Lord Matthews may refer to:

- Hugh Matthews, Lord Matthews (1953-) Scottish judge
- Victor Matthews, Baron Matthews (1919-1995) British businessman
