= Howard French =

Howard French may refer to:

- Howard W. French (born 1957), American journalist, author and photographer
- Howard French (British journalist) (1912–2008), British newspaper editor
