= Charles Eade =

British newspaper editor

Charles Eade (10 June 1903 – 27 August 1964) was a British newspaper editor.

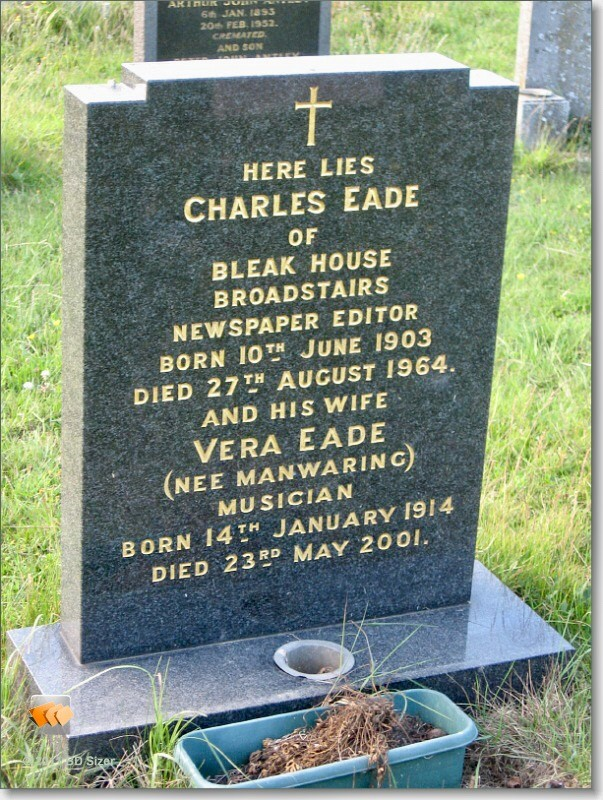
The grave of Charles Eade in the churchyard of St Peter's, Kent

Born in Leytonstone, Eade became a subeditor on the Daily Chronicle at the age of fourteen, then worked on Lloyd's Weekly Newspaper and the Daily Herald. From 1922, he wrote for the Daily Mirror, but also worked on the Sunday Pictorial and The Observer. In 1928, he bought the East Ham Echo and South Essex Mail, but took little interest in the title, spending two years travelling the world. Early in the 1930s, Eade joined the Sunday Express, becoming Deputy Editor, then moved to the same post at the Sunday Graphic and then the Daily Sketch. In 1938, he was appointed editor of the Sunday Dispatch, holding the post until 1957.

Outside his editorial roles, Eade was an early radio sports commentator from 1932 to 1938, while during World War II he was public relations advisor to Louis Mountbatten. From 1942, he edited Winston Churchill's speeches for publication, and in 1953, he edited Churchill by his Contemporaries.

Eade was appointed as a director of Associated Newspapers in 1947. He served on the Press Council for a year from 1956, and in his last years, he was a member of the council of the Commonwealth Press Union.

Media offices
Preceded by Collin Brooks	Editor of the Sunday Dispatch; 1938–1957	Succeeded by Bert Gunn
