= Simon Jenkins =

English journalist and author

Sir Simon Jenkins FSA FRSL
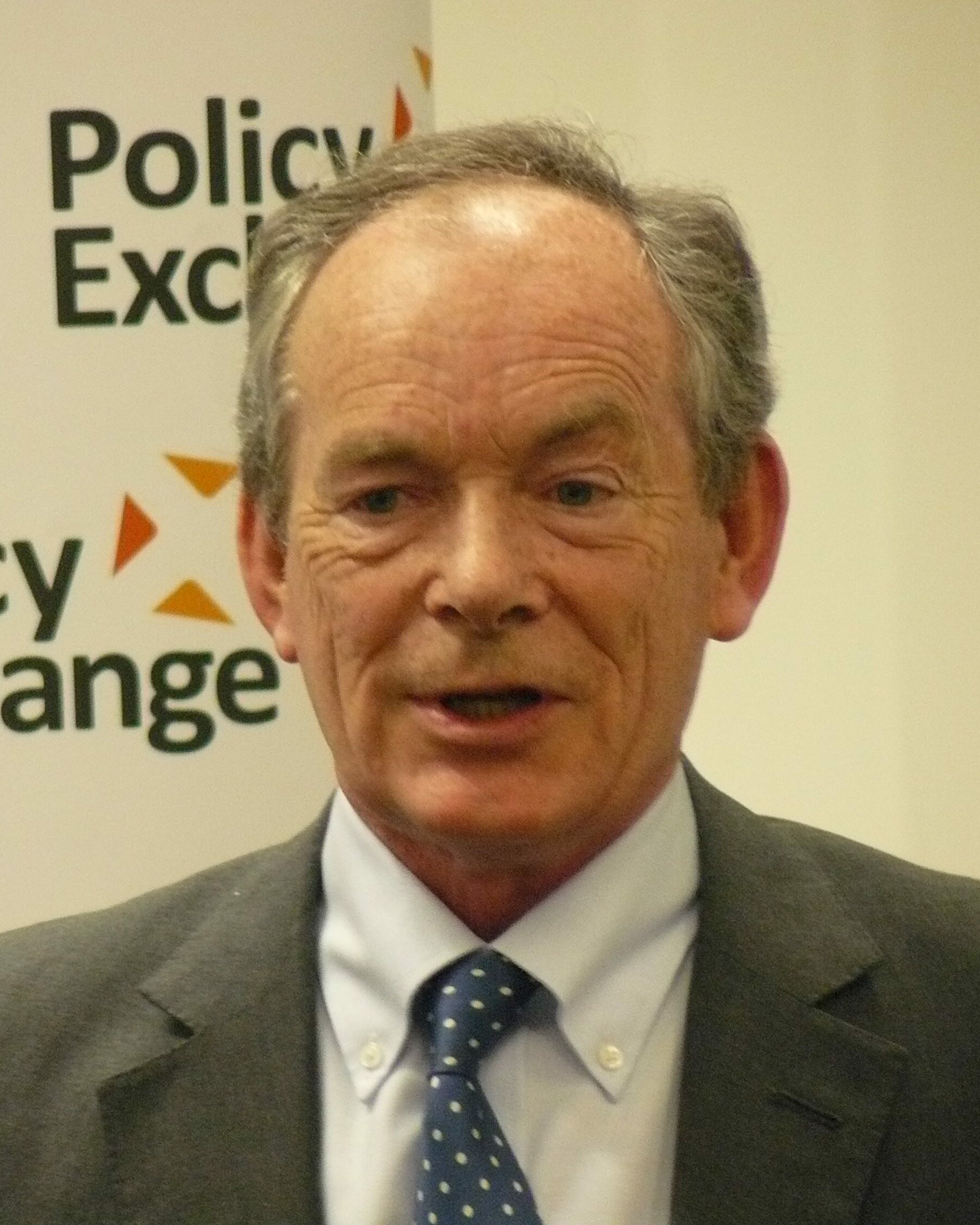
- Jenkins in 2012
- Born: Simon David Jenkins; 10 June 1943 (age 83); Birmingham, England
- Education: Mill Hill School; St John's College, Oxford
- Occupations: Journalist, author and editor
- Spouses: Gayle Hunnicutt (m. 1978; div. 2009) Hannah Kaye (m. 2014)
- Awards: Knight Bachelor

Sir Simon David Jenkins FSA FRSL FLSW (born 10 June 1943) is a British author, a newspaper columnist and editor. He was editor of the Evening Standard from 1976 to 1978 and of The Times from 1990 to 1992.

Jenkins chaired the National Trust from 2008 to 2014. He currently writes columns for The Guardian.

== Early life ==
Jenkins was born 10 June 1943, in Birmingham, England. His father, Daniel Thomas Jenkins, was a Welsh professor of systematic theology at Princeton Theological Seminary and a Minister in the Congregational and then United Reformed Church. He was educated at Mill Hill School and St John's College, Oxford, where he earned a degree in Philosophy, Politics and Economics.

== Career ==
=== Journalism ===
After graduating from the University of Oxford, where he was the Oxford Union correspondent for the student newspaper Cherwell, Jenkins initially worked at Country Life magazine, before joining the Times Educational Supplement. He was then features editor and columnist on the Evening Standard before editing the Insight pages of The Sunday Times. From 1976 to 1978, he was editor of the Evening Standard, before becoming political editor of The Economist from 1979 to 1986. He edited The Times from 1990 to 1992, and since then has been a columnist for The Times and The Guardian. In 1998, he received the What the Papers Say Journalist of the Year award.

In January 2005, he announced he was ending his 15-year association with The Times to write a book, before joining The Guardian as a columnist. He retained a column at The Sunday Times and was a contributing blogger at The Huffington Post. He gave up both on becoming chairman of the National Trust in 2008, when he also resumed an occasional column for the Evening Standard.

==== Opinions ====
In April 2009, The Guardian withdrew one of Jenkins's articles from its website after African National Congress leader and South African president-elect Jacob Zuma sued the paper for defamation. The Guardian issued an apology, and settled the libel case for an undisclosed sum.

In February 2010, Jenkins argued in a Guardian article that British control over the Falkland Islands was an "expensive legacy of empire" and should be handed over to the Argentinian government. He argued that they could be leased back under the supervision of the United Nations and that the 2,500 or so Falkland Islanders should not have "an unqualified veto on British government policy".

In a piece in The Guardian in June 2010, jenkins wrote that the government should "cut [defence], all £45 billion of it. ... With the end of the Cold War in the 1990s that threat [of global communism] vanished." In August 2016 he wrote in The Guardian in support of NATO membership, saying: "It is a real deterrent, and its plausibility rests on the assurance of collective response".

Jenkins said he voted for the UK to remain within the European Union in the 2016 United Kingdom European Union membership referendum, arguing in The Guardian that leaving would provide Germany with dominance over the remainder of the union: "It would leave Germany effectively alone at the head of Europe, alternately hesitant and bullying".

Soon after Rishi Sunak became Prime Minister, Jenkins wrote that his aides were "young, sneakered, tieless image-makers, and fiercely loyal to him". They were "special advisers, thinktanks and lobby groups isolated from the world outside."

Jenkins has consistently argued against Western military intervention in and support for Ukraine in the Russo-Ukrainian War. Before the outbreak of the Russian invasion in January 2022, amid heightened tensions, Jenkins wrote a pair of columns arguing that the United Kingdom should stay out of the "border dispute", one he argues is a direct result of 'NATO expansionism'. In 2023, he wrote a column discouraging the supplying of jets as military aid. In early 2024, he wrote that NATO was growing reckless in the conflict, as the war reached a "predictable stalemate". Jenkins has been criticised for his opinions on Ukraine by some journalists and commentators, including Mark Laity.

In May 2024, following the local elections, he wrote calling metro mayors a "farce of local democracy" and advocating their abolition.

=== Books ===
Jenkins has written several books on the politics, history and architecture of England, including England's Thousand Best Churches and England's Thousand Best Houses. In his 2011 book A Short History of England, he argued that the British Empire "was a remarkable institution that dismantled itself in good order".

In 2022, Jenkins's book The Celts: A Sceptical History stoked some controversy on account of his incredulous view of the Celts as a distinct cultural entity. The release of the work was met with a number of hostile reviews from specialists in Celtic studies, with these critics of the book alleging factual errors in the work as well as of the misrepresentation of sources.

=== Public appointments ===
Jenkins served on the boards of British Rail 1979–1990 and London Transport 1984–1986. He was a member of the Millennium Commission from February 1994 to December 2000, and has also sat on the board of trustees of The Architecture Foundation. From 1985 to 1990, he was deputy chairman of English Heritage.

In July 2008, it was announced that he had been chosen as the new chairman of the National Trust; he took over the three-year post from William Proby in November of that year. He remained in the post until November 2014.

== Personal life and honours ==
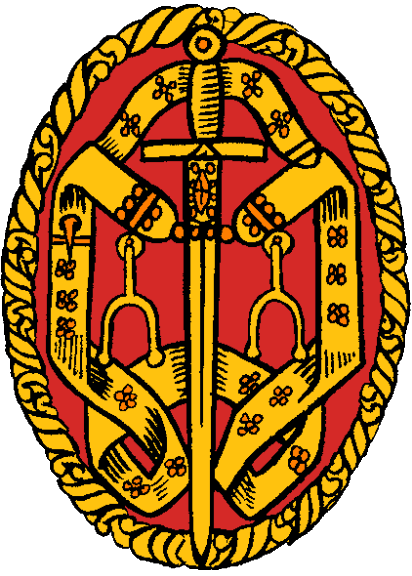
Insignia of Knight Bachelor

Jenkins married the American actress Gayle Hunnicutt in 1978; the couple had one son. They separated in 2008 and divorced in 2009. He married Hannah Kaye, events producer at Intelligence Squared, in 2014.

He was elected a Fellow of the Royal Society of Literature in 2003.

Jenkins was appointed a Knight Bachelor for services to journalism in the 2004 New Year Honours.

In 2022, Jenkins was elected as a Fellow of the Learned Society of Wales.

== Selected works ==
- Simon Jenkins (1969), Education and Labour's Axe, Bow Publications, ISBN 0-900182-79-2
- Simon Jenkins (1971), Here to Live: Study of Race Relations in an English Town, Runnymede Trust, ISBN 0-902397-12-5
- Simon Jenkins (1975), Landlords to London: Story of a Capital and Its Growth, Constable, ISBN 0-09-460150-X
- Simon Jenkins (1979), Newspapers: The Power and the Money, Faber & Faber, ISBN 0-571-11468-7
- Simon Jenkins (1981), Newspapers Through the Looking-glass, Manchester Statistical Society, ISBN 0-85336-058-8
- Max Hastings & Simon Jenkins (1984), Battle for the Falklands, Michael Joseph, ISBN 0-7181-2578-9
- Simon Jenkins & Anne Sloman (1985), With Respect, Ambassador: An Inquiry into the Foreign Office, BBC, ISBN 0-563-20329-3
- Simon Jenkins (1986), The Market for Glory: Fleet Street Ownership in the Twentieth Century, Faber & Faber, ISBN 0-571-14627-9
- Simon Jenkins and Robert Ilson (1992), "The Times" English Style and Usage Guide, Times Books, ISBN 0-7230-0396-3
- Simon Jenkins (1993), The Selling of Mary Davies and Other Writings, John Murray, ISBN 0-7195-5298-2
- Simon Jenkins (1994), Against the Grain, John Murray, ISBN 0-7195-5570-1
- Simon Jenkins (1995), Accountable to None: Tory Nationalization of Britain, Hamish Hamilton, ISBN 0-241-13591-5
- Simon Jenkins (1999), England's Thousand Best Churches, Allen Lane, ISBN 0-7139-9281-6
- Simon Jenkins (2003), England's Thousand Best Houses, Allen Lane, ISBN 0-7139-9596-3
- Simon Jenkins (2006), Thatcher & Sons – A Revolution in Three Acts, Penguin, ISBN 978-0-7139-9595-4
- Simon Jenkins (2008), Wales: Churches, Houses, Castles, Allen Lane, ISBN 978-0-713-99893-1
- Simon Jenkins (2011), A Short History of England, Profile Books, ISBN 978-1-84668-461-6
- Simon Jenkins (2013), England's Hundred Best Views, Profile Books, ISBN 978-1-781250-96-9
- Simon Jenkins (2016), England's Cathedrals, Little Brown, ISBN 978-1-408706-45-9
- Simon Jenkins (2017), Britain's 100 Best Railway Stations, Penguin Books, ISBN 978-0-241978-98-6
- Simon Jenkins (2018), A Short History of Europe: From Pericles to Putin, Penguin Books, ISBN 978-0-241-35252-6
- Simon Jenkins (2019), A Short History of London: The Creation of a World Capital, Viking, ISBN 978-0241369982
- Simon Jenkins (2022), Cathedrals: Masterpieces of Architecture, Feats of Engineering, Icons of Faith, Rizzoli, ISBN 978-0847871407
- Simon Jenkins (2022), The Celts: A Sceptical History, Profile Books, ISBN 978-1800810662
- Simon Jenkins (2024), A Short History of British Architecture: From Stonehenge to the Shard, Viking, ISBN 978-0241674956

Media offices
Preceded by Roy Wright	Deputy Editor of the Evening Standard; 1976	Succeeded by Richard Bourne
Preceded by Charles Wintour	Editor of the Evening Standard; 1976–1978	Succeeded by Charles Wintour
Preceded by Charles Wilson	Editor of The Times; 1990–1992	Succeeded by Peter Stothard
