= Bert Gunn =

British newspaper editor

Herbert Smith Gunn (3 April 1903 – 2 March 1962) was a British newspaper editor.

== Biography ==
Born in Gravesend, Bert Gunn worked as a reporter for the Kent Messenger, and then the Straits Times in Singapore. He returned to the UK to work at the Manchester Evening News, then the London Evening News and the Evening Standard. He also married, and had two sons: Thom Gunn, later a poet, and Ander Gunn, later a photographer.

In 1936, Gunn became the first northern editor of the Daily Express, then in 1943 became managing editor. He wrote the headline "It's That Man Again", referring to Hitler, which later became the title of a popular radio show.

Gunn became editor of the Evening Standard in 1944, but owner Lord Beaverbrook disagreed with his plans to adopt a more populist approach, and Gunn left in 1952. Gunn also revealed that Labour Party MP Garry Allighan was leaking stories to the newspaper, following which Allighan resigned.

In 1953, Gunn joined the Daily Sketch as its editor, and doubled its circulation in six years. In 1958–1959, he was the President of the Institute of Journalists. He moved to edit the Sunday Dispatch in 1959, but this was merged with the Sunday Express in 1961 and Gunn resigned from Associated Newspapers in 1962.

Media offices
Preceded by Sydney Elliott	Editor of the Evening Standard; 1945–1952	Succeeded by Percy Elland
Preceded by Henry Clapp	Editor of the Daily Sketch; 1953–1959	Succeeded by Colin Valdar
Preceded by Charles Eade	Editor of the Sunday Dispatch; 1959–1961	Succeeded by Position abolished
