= John Leese =

British newspaper editor (1930–1991)

John Arthur Leese (4 January 1930 – 23 September 1991) was a British newspaper editor.

== Biography ==
John Leese studied at Bishop Vesey's Grammar School. He edited the Coventry Evening Telegraph in the mid-1960s, then moved to London to work on the Evening News. The paper closed in 1980, and Leese moved to New York City and produced the SoHo Weekly News for a year.

He returned to the UK to launch You magazine for the Mail on Sunday, then in 1986 became Editor of the Evening Standard. He resigned early in 1991 due to illness, and died in September of that year. His son, Mike Leese, was also a news editor at the Evening Standard.

Media offices
Preceded by Louis Kirby	Editor of the Evening Standard; 1986–1991	Succeeded by Paul Dacre
