= Charles Wintour =

British newspaper editor (1917–1999)

Charles Wintour CBE
- Born: Charles Vere Wintour; 18 May 1917; Pamphill Manor, Pamphill, Dorset, England
- Died: 4 November 1999 (aged 82); London, England
- Education: University of Cambridge
- Spouses: Eleanor Trego Baker (m. 1940; div. 1979): Audrey Slaughter (m. c. 1980)
- Children: 5, including Anna and Patrick Wintour
- Parent(s): Fitzgerald Wintour; Alice Jane Blanche Foster
- Relatives: Cordelia James, Baroness James of Rusholme (sister)

Charles Vere Wintour CBE (18 May 1917 – 4 November 1999) was a British newspaper editor. He was the father of Anna Wintour, the Vogue magazine editor-in-chief, and Patrick Wintour, the diplomatic editor of The Guardian newspaper. After a life in media and publishing, Charles Wintour became the editor-in-chief of the London Evening Standard.

Under his leadership, the Evening Standard was described as a "blend of popular and serious news and opinion" which prefigured many of the broadsheets of the 21st century". Wintour was educated at the University of Cambridge, where he edited Granta magazine.

== Early life ==
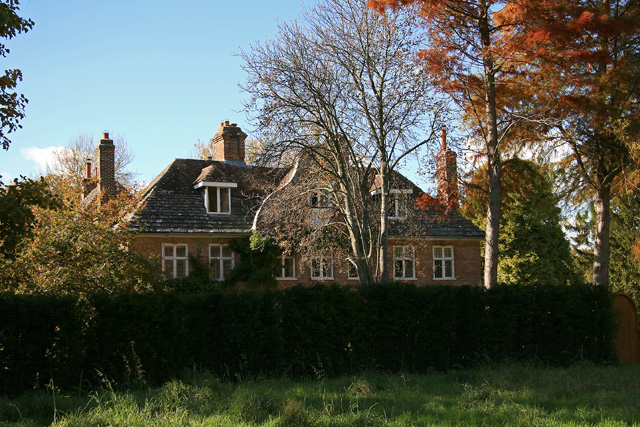
Pamphill Manor, Wintour's childhood home

Wintour was born in Pamphill Manor, near Wimborne, Dorset to Alice Jane Blanche Foster and Major-General Fitzgerald Wintour. He was the brother of Cordelia Mary Wintour. He wrote articles for the Radio Times when he was at Oundle School and won a prize awarded by the Daily Mail. He went up to Peterhouse, Cambridge to read English and history. At Cambridge, he edited briefly the Granta magazine with Eric Hobsbawm.

== Career ==
After Cambridge, Wintour took an advertising job in London but left at the start of World War II to join the Royal Norfolk Regiment. During the war, he was awarded the military MBE, the Croix de Guerre and the Bronze Star.

In 1946, Wintour became a leader writer for the London Evening Standard. He was soon promoted to political editor, then moved to the Sunday Express as assistant editor. He returned to the Standard as deputy editor, during which he convinced Lord Beaverbrook to launch the Evening Standard Awards for theatre in 1955. Wintour became managing editor of the Daily Express in 1958, then in 1959 moved back to the Standard as editor.

Although circulation fell under Wintour's editorship, he was well-regarded and was considered for the post of editor of The Times in 1967. He was particularly passionate about the paper's politics and high-society gossip column, the Londoner's Diary, once saying: "To go to a decent London dinner party without having read the Diary would be to go out unprepared for proper conversation."

Wintour remained the editor until 1976, when he became managing director of the Daily Express and supervised its transition from a broadsheet to a tabloid. He negotiated to merge the London Evening Standard with the Evening News and championed for keeping the staff and approach of the Standard. As a result, the merger was called off. The Express Group was sold to Trafalgar House, and new owner Victor Matthews appointed Wintour editor of the Standard again in 1978. In 1979, Wintour joined the Press Council and served for two years. In 1980, the Standard and the News were finally merged. While the name of the Standard was kept, Wintour and his senior executives were replaced by former News editor Louis Kirby and his executives.

In 1981, Wintour launched the Sunday Express Magazine with his new wife Audrey Slaughter. In 1984, they launched Working Woman magazine. A year later, Wintour became editor of the Press Gazette and advised on the launch of Today, The Independent, the new London Daily News, and the breakfast television show TV-am.

He wrote two books based on his experience: Pressures on the Press in 1972, an account of decision-making during every hour of the day in a newsroom; and The Rise and Fall of Fleet Street in 1989, an analysis of London's Fleet Street as a publishing centre and the people responsible for its historic rise and the more recent responses to new technology.

Wintour retired in 1989 and spent his later years supporting the Liberal Democrats and chairing the regional National Art Collections Fund.

== Personal life ==
In 1940 Wintour married Eleanor "Nonie" Trego Baker. They divorced in 1979. A year later, he married Audrey Slaughter with whom he was involved in magazine publishing.

He had five children, including the prominent journalists Anna and Patrick.

== Death ==
Wintour died in London, U.K. on 4 November 1999. He was 82. The Guardian stated in their obituary that he was "...one of the greatest editors of the second half of the century. He essentially invented the modern London Evening Standard." The Independent noted his influence in launching new newspapers "...during the 1980s, as new technology and the weakening of the print unions provided the opportunity for long- awaited change in the industry, he lent his experience and advice to several new launches, among them The Independent."

== Legacy ==
=== Influence ===
Organisers of major drama awards have acknowledged Wintour's impact on London theatre. When he retired in 1982, the Society of London Theatre gave him the Society of London Theatre Special Award, which usually went to actors, directors and such. After his death, his Evening Standard Theatre Awards added his name into one category to create The Charles Wintour Award for Most Promising Playwright. At his memorial wake in 1999 that was supervised by his daughter Anna, the playwright Harold Pinter read from his work and expressed gratitude for his play The Caretaker winning the Best Play award in 1960, which lifted off his career.

Media offices
Preceded by John Junor	Deputy Editor of the Evening Standard; 1954–1959	Succeeded by Derek Marks
Preceded by Percy Elland	Editor of the Evening Standard; 1959–1976	Succeeded by Simon Jenkins
Preceded by Simon Jenkins	Editor of the Evening Standard; 1978–1980	Succeeded by Louis Kirby
