= Wintour =

Wintour may refer to

== Places ==
- Wintour's Leap, a rock climbing location in Gloucestershire, England
- Mount Wintour in Canada

== Surname ==
- Wintour (surname)
- Wintour baronets

== Other uses ==
- Anna Wintour (song) by Azealia Banks
- Anna Wintour Costume Center, a wing of the Metropolitan Museum of Art in New York, U.S.
- The Wintour Vestments made by recusant Catholic seamstress Helena Wintour
- Wintour is Coming, a concert tour by American rock band Fall Out Boy
