= Alice Thompson (disambiguation) =

Alice Thompson, or Alice Thomson may refer to:

- Alice Meynell, née Thompson (1847–1922), British writer, editor, critic, and suffragist, remembered mainly as a poet
- Alice Thompson (fl. 1990s–2010s), Scottish novelist
- Alice Thomson (born 1967), British political journalist
