= Cordelia James, Lady James of Rusholme =

British teacher and justice of the peace

The Right Honourable The Lady James of Rusholme JP

Personal details
- Born: Cordelia Mary Wintour; 30 November 1912 York, North Yorkshire
- Died: 12 March 2007 (aged 94) Thirsk, North Yorkshire
- Spouse: Eric James, Baron James of Rusholme
- Children: Oliver James
- Parent(s): Fitzgerald Wintour; Alice Jane Blanche Foster
- Relatives: Charles Wintour (brother); Dame Anna Wintour (niece); Patrick Wintour (nephew)
- Occupation: schoolteacher, civil servant

Cordelia Mary James, Baroness James of Rusholme JP (née Wintour; 30 November 1912 – 12 March 2007) was a British teacher and judicial officer. She served as a justice of the peace and as chairwoman on the report of the Howard League for Penal Reform's Working Party on Custody During Trial. Wintour was the wife of fellow educator Eric James, Baron James of Rusholme, who was created a life peer in 1959. She was an aunt of Vogue editor-in-chief Dame Anna Wintour.

== Early life and family ==
James was born Cordelia Mary Wintour on 30 November 1912 in York, Yorkshire to Major-General Fitzgerald Wintour and Alice Jane Blanche Foster.

On her father's side, she was a great-granddaughter of James Milnes Gaskell and a great-great-granddaughter of Charles Williams-Wynn. She was also the great-great-great-granddaughter of Sir Watkin Williams-Wynn, 4th Baronet and the great-great-great-granddaughter of British Prime Minister George Grenville. On her mother's side, she was the great-great-granddaughter of Elizabeth Cavendish, Duchess of Devonshire and John Thomas Foster. Her great-great-great-grandfather, Frederick Hervey, 4th Earl of Bristol, served as the Bishop of Derry. James was the niece of Sir Augustus Vere Foster, 4th Baronet and a grandniece of Charles Milnes Gaskell. She had one brother, Charles Vere Wintour.

== Career ==
James was a schoolteacher and a justice of the peace. She served as chairwoman on the report of the Howard League for Penal Reform's Working Party on Custody During Trial in 1976.

== Personal life ==
James was the aunt of editors Dame Anna Wintour and Patrick Wintour.

She was a friend of the philosopher Sir Thomas Malcolm Knox. In December 1935, she wrote to Knox with news about her job, expressing sympathy for his wife's illness, and news about her classmates at school. In July 1936, she wrote a letter congratulating Knox on his appointment as Principal of the University of St Andrews, her interview for the British Civil Service, a review, and an enquiry as to Knox's wife's thoughts on moving to St Andrews.

In 1939, she married the educator Eric John Francis James. They had one son, Oliver Francis Wintour James. Her husband was knighted in 1956, at which time she was entitled to the style Lady James. In 1959, her husband was created a life peer as Baron James of Rusholme, of Fallowfield in the County palatine of Lancashire. Upon her husband's elevation to the peerage, she became the Lady James of Rusholme.

In the 1990s, James donated the Records of Lord James of Rusholme to the archives at the University of York.

James died on 12 March 2007 in Thirsk.
