= Alice Thomson =

British political journalist

Alice Thomson (born 24 April 1967) is a British political journalist. She is an associate editor, weekly columnist, and political interviewer for The Times.

== Education and career ==
Thomson was educated at Bute House Preparatory School for Girls in West London, the School of St Helen and St Katharine in Abingdon, Oxfordshire and Marlborough College, Wiltshire. She graduated from Bristol University with a BA in history and received an MA in newspaper journalism from City University London. Thomson became a trainee on The Times in 1990 before becoming a foreign correspondent, feature writer and political reporter for the newspaper. In 1997 she moved to The Daily Telegraph as a columnist and leader writer and also wrote the restaurant reviews and political interviews before re-joining The Times in 2008. She has written for Vogue and The Spectator and appeared on Question Time and Newsnight.

In 2014, jointly with colleagues from The Times, she was Political Journalist of the Year in the Press Gazette awards. She was previously a Trustee of the think tank Policy Exchange, on the Policy Committee of the CPRE, and a governor of Bute House preparatory school. Thomson presents the podcast interview series What I Wish I'd Known with fellow Times columnist Rachel Sylvester which has now run for eight series on Times Radio, which began in July 2020. In December 2022, Thomson was chosen as the Interviewer of the Year at the Press Gazette British Journalism Awards.

== Publications ==
Thomson wrote the book The Singing Line about her ancestor Sir Charles Todd, who connected Australia to the world by building a telegraph line from Adelaide to Darwin; the city of Alice Springs was named after his wife Alice. She is the author, with Rachel Sylvester, of What I Wish I'd Known When I Was Young: The Art and Science of Growing Up.

== Personal life ==
Thomson has three sons, (born in 2004, 2000 and 2006) and one daughter, (born in 2002) by her husband, Edward Heathcoat Amory, whom she married in 1994. Her paternal great-grandfather, J. J. Thomson, was awarded a Nobel prize for the discovery of the electron. Her grandfather, GP Thomson, was awarded the Nobel prize for physics for the discovery of the wave properties of the electron. Her maternal great-grandfather, William Henry Bragg, was awarded, together with his son, William Lawrence Bragg, a Nobel prize for Physics for the analysis of crystal structure by means of X-ray. Alice along with her husband live at Chevithorne Barton, an estate in Devon, which houses the Plant Heritage National Oak collection.
