= Richard Dennen =

British journalist and editor of Tatler

Richard Sergei John Dennen (born April 1980) is a British journalist and editor of Tatler since 2018. He is best known for his contributions to the fashion industry. He previously contributed to publications including The Sunday Times, The London Evening Standard, and The Mail on Sunday.

== Early life and education ==
Dennen is the great-grandson of Field Marshal Earl Haig of Bemersyde and the son of Lyle Dennen, an Archdeacon of the Anglican Communion. He attended Charterhouse before studying French Civilisation at the Paris-Sorbonne University for his gap year. He completed his education at the University of St Andrews and graduated with a degree in the History of Art.

== Career ==
Dennen began his career at Tatler, first as a young assistant and then as features editor. He moved to The Sunday Times and then the Mail on Sunday before returning to Tatler as editor in February 2018. He introduced Nigerian artist Oluwole Omofemi to the international audience thorough commissioning him for the commemorative Platinum Jubilee cover of Queen Elizabeth II.

Media offices
| Preceded by Kate Reardon | Editor of Tatler; 2018–present | Incumbent |
