= Wynter (surname) =

Wynter is a surname, and may refer to:

- Alex Wynter (born 1993), English footballer
- Angela Wynter (born 1957), Jamaican-born British actress
- Andrew Wynter (1819–1876), English physician
- Brian Wynter (born 1959), Jamaican banker and financial regulator
- Bryan Wynter (1915–1975), British painter
- Curtis Wynter, English football player
- Dana Wynter (1931–2011), British actress
- Danny Lee Wynter (born 1982), British actor
- Desai Wynter (born 1966), United States Virgin Islands sprinter
- Ed Wynter (1904–1974), Australian rugby league footballer
- Edward Wynter (1560–1619), English mariner, landowner and Member of Parliament
- Gilbert Wynter (born c. 1961), British jeweller, disappeared 1998
- Hector Wynter (1926–2002), Jamaican educator, editor, diplomat and politician
- Henry Wynter (1886–1945), Australian general
- Iona Wynter (born 1968), Jamaican athlete
- Jessie Wynter (born 1996), Australian social media figure
- John Wynter (1555–1638), English explorer and naval officer
- Jordan Wynter (born 1993), English footballer
- Katherine Wynter (born 1996), Jamaican badminton player
- Mark Wynter (born 1943), English singer and actor
- Mark Alexander Wynter-Blyth (1906–1963), English schoolteacher and naturalist
- Nathaniel Ian Wynter (1954–2022), Jamaican musician
- Odette De Wynter (1927–1998), Belgian notary
- Paul Wynter (1935–2019), Antigua and Barbuda bodybuilder
- Philip Wynter (1793–1871), English cleric and college head
- Ray Wynter (born 1955), Jamaican cricketer
- Sarah Wynter (born 1973), Australian actress
- Sylvia Wynter (born 1928), Jamaican writer
- Thomas Wynter (c.1510–c.1546), English priest, son of Thomas Wolsey
- Timothy Wynter (born 1996), Jamaican swimmer
- Tom Wynter (born 1990), English footballer
- Walter Essex Wynter (1860–1945), British physician
- William Wynter (c.1521–1589), English admiral and Surveyor of the Navy

== See also ==
- Winter (surname)
- Wintour (surname)
