= Rachel Sylvester =

British political journalist (born 1969)

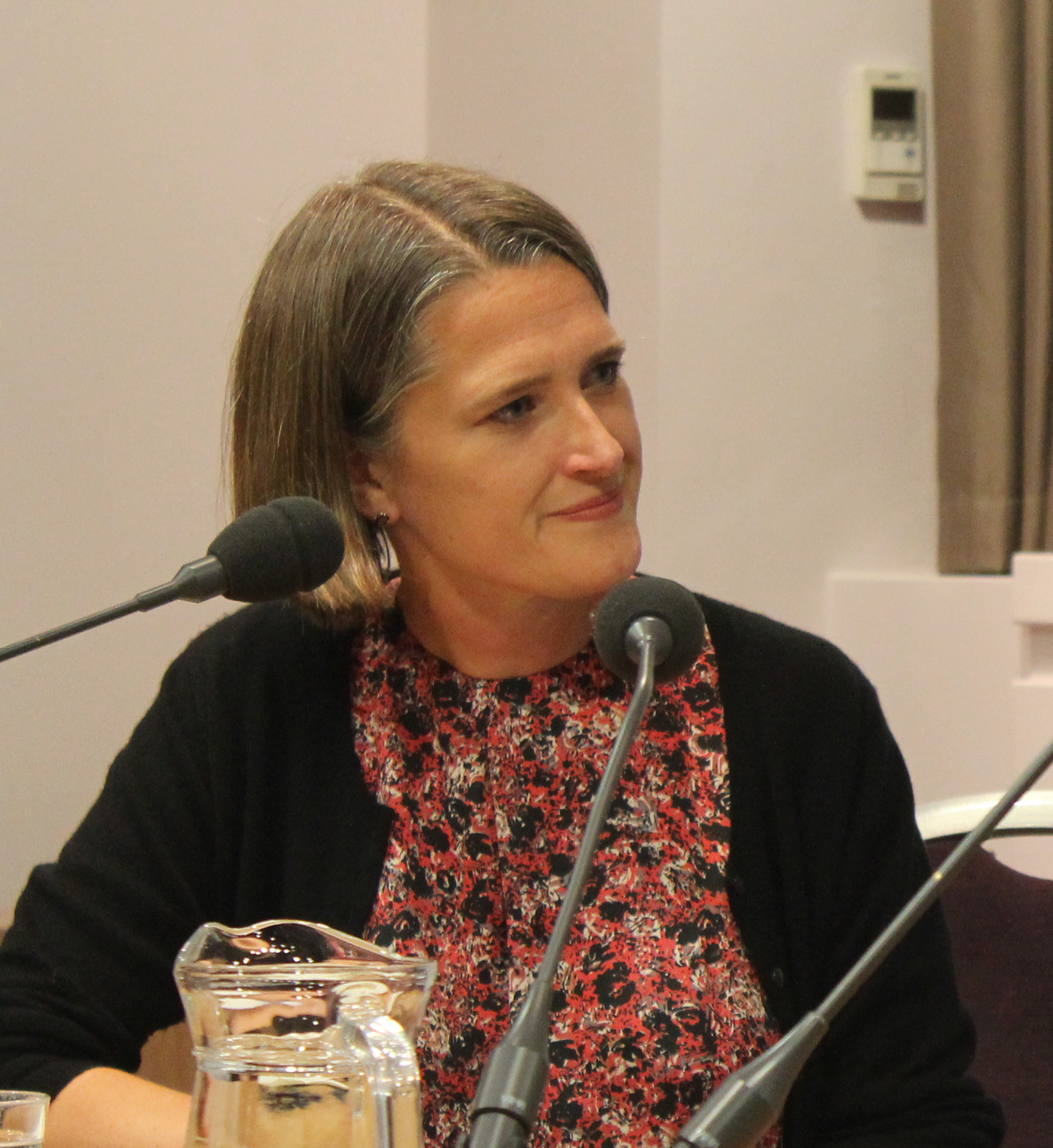
- Sylvester in 2012
- Born: 13 November 1969 (age 56)
- Education: South Hampstead HS
- Alma mater: Somerville College, Oxford
- Occupation: Journalist
- Employer: The Observer
- Spouse: Patrick Wintour (m. 2002)
- Children: 2

Rachel Mynfreda Sylvester (born 13 November 1969) is a British political journalist. Since 2025 Sylvester has been political editor of The Observer, and was previously a columnist with The Times

== Background and education ==
Born in North West London to Nigel Sylvester and Mary, née Cawston, she was educated at South Hampstead High School, an independent school for girls, before reading English at Somerville College, Oxford.

== Career ==
Sylvester joined The Sunday Telegraph newspaper in 1992. She left for a one-year period as political editor of The Independent on Sunday in 1998. She returned in 1999 to The Daily Telegraph as assistant editor (politics), a position she held until 2008.

Sylvester joined The Times in June 2008, where she wrote a weekly political column and a weekly interview piece, often in collaboration with Alice Thomson. She was named 2015 Political Journalist of the Year at the British Press Awards. Iain Martin described Sylvester and Thomson as "highly skilled interviewers [with] a gift for getting people to burble on until they say something highly revealing."

Sylvester conducted an interview with Conservative Party leadership candidate Andrea Leadsom during the 2016 leadership election with Leadsom making unhelpful comments about her competitor Theresa May. Leadsom then stood aside in the aftermath of the interview's release allowing May to become leader, which the Evening Standard said "confirmed Sylvester's status as one of the country's most influential political commentators". She was named 2016 Journalist of the Year by the Political Studies Association.

Sylvester has presented the interview series "Past Imperfect" with Thomson on Times Radio, which began in July 2020. Among their first guests were Sir Tony Blair and Paul Nurse.

In April 2025, Sylvester became political editor of The Observer following its takeover by Tortoise Media.

== See also ==
- Patrick Wintour
