= Tatler =

British society magazine

- Cover of the December 2019 issue, Meghan, Duchess of Sussex
- Editor: Richard Dennen
- Categories: Society
- Frequency: Monthly
- Total circulation: 844,512 (2025)
- Founder: Clement Shorter
- First issue: 3 July 1901
- Company: Illustrated News, Ltd. (1928–1968); Illustrated County Magazine Group (1968–19?); Gary Bogard (1979–1982); Condé Nast (1982–present)
- Country: United Kingdom
- Based in: London
- Language: English
- Website: tatler.com

Tatler (stylised in all caps) is a monthly society magazine that covers high society, culture, style news, beauty, royals, travel, and education. Beginning publication in 1901, it has been published by Condé Nast since 1982. Since 2018, Richard Dennen has overseen the magazine as editor-in-chief. Notable former editors include Mark Boxer, Tina Brown, Libby Purves, Geordie Greig, and Kate Reardon.

Headquartered at the Adelphi building in the Adelphi district of London, Tatler traces its origins to the Richard Steele-founded literary and society journal The Tatler that was published from 1709 to 1711. In 1901, Tatler began publication. In 1940, it absorbed Bystander and rebranded to The Tatler and Bystander. In 1965, the magazine rebranded to London Life before returning to the Tatler name in 1968.

Hong Kong Tatler launched in 1977 as the first international edition. It was later disassociated from the British edition. In 2008, Tatler Russia launched. Tatler ceased Russian operations in 2022 due to the Russian invasion of Ukraine and as of 2026 the British edition is the only Condé Nast-published Tatler.

== Background ==
=== Editors ===
Editor-in-Chief	Start year	End year	Ref.
Clement Shorter	1901	1926	
Edward Huskinson	1908	1940	
Reginald Stewart Hooper	1940	1945	
Sean Fielding	1946	1954	
Philip Youngman-Carter	1954	1957	
Harry Aubrey Fieldhouse	1960	1961	
Mark Boxer	1965	1965	
Ian Howard	1965		
Robert Innes-Smith	1968		
Leslie Field	1978		
Tina Brown	1979	1983	
Libby Purves	1983	1983	
Mark Boxer	1983	1988	
Emma Soames	1988	1990	
Jane Procter	1990	1999	
Geordie Greig	1999	2009	
Catherine Ostler	2009	2011	
Kate Reardon	2011	2017	
Richard Dennen	2018	present	

== History ==
Tatler was introduced on 3 July 1901, by Clement Shorter, publisher of The Sphere. It was named after the original literary and society journal founded by Richard Steele in 1709. Originally sold occasionally as The Tatler and for some time a weekly publication, it had a subtitle varying on "an illustrated journal of society and the drama". It contained news and pictures of high society balls, charity events, race meetings, shooting parties, fashion and gossip, with cartoons by "The Tout" and H. M. Bateman.

In 1940, the magazine absorbed The Bystander, creating a publication called The Tatler and Bystander. In 1961, Illustrated Newspapers, which published Tatler, The Sphere, and The Illustrated London News, was bought by Roy Thomson.

== London Life ==
In 1965, Tatler was retitled London Life. The magazine, under the editorship of Mark Boxer, became an influential record of the Swinging Sixties in London.

== Return to the Tatler name ==
In 1968, London Life was bought by Guy Wayte's Illustrated County Magazine group and the Tatler name restored. Wayte's group had a number of county magazines in the style of Tatler, each of which mixed the same syndicated content with county-specific local content. Wayte, "a moustachioed playboy of a conman" was convicted of fraud in 1980 for inflating Tatler's circulation figures from 15,000 to 49,000.

Hong Kong Tatler was launched under licence in March 1977, the magazines are no longer associated and the Hong Kong edition now operates Tatler publications in Asia and Africa under Tatler Asia.

The magazine was sold and relaunched as a monthly magazine in 1977, called Tatler & Bystander until 1982. Tina Brown (editor 1979–83), created a vibrant and youthful Tatler and is credited with putting the edge, the irony and the wit back into what was then an almost moribund social title. She referred to it as an upper-class comic and by increasing its influence and circulation made it an interesting enough operation for the then owner, Gary Bogard, to sell to publishers Condé Nast. Brown subsequently transferred to New York, to another Condé Nast title, Vanity Fair.

After several later editors and a looming recession, the magazine was once again ailing; Jane Procter was brought in to re-invent the title for the 1990s. The circulation rose to over 90,000, a figure which was exceeded five years later by Geordie Greig. The magazine created various supplements including the Travel and Restaurant Guides, the often-referred to and closely watched Most Invited and Little Black Book lists, as well as various parties.

Kate Reardon became editor in 2011, having previously worked for American Vogue, Tatler and Vanity Fair. Under Reardon's directorship Tatler retained its position as having the wealthiest audience of Condé Nast's magazines, exceeding an average of $175,000 in 2013.

Reardon left the title at the end of 2017. The appointment of Richard Dennen as the new editor was announced at the beginning of February 2018, and he took up the post on 12 February.

In 2014, the BBC broadcast a three-part fly-on-the-wall documentary television series, titled Posh People: Inside Tatler, featuring the editorial team going about their various jobs.

In 2021, Tatler commissioned Nigerian painter Oluwole Omofemi to paint the last painting of Queen Elizabeth II before her death.

== Little Black Book ==
One of Tatler's most talked-about annual features is the Little Black Book. The supplement is a compilation of "the most eligible, most beddable, most exotically plumaged birds and blokes in town", and individuals previously featured have included those from a number of backgrounds: aristocrats and investment bankers sit alongside celebrities and those working in the media sector.

== Contributors ==
=== Past contributors ===
- Christina Broom – photographer
- Diana, Lady Mosley – commissioned to write a Letters from Paris section in the 1960s.
- Una-Mary Parker – Social editor in the 1970s
- The Marchioness of Milford Haven – Social editor
- Isabella Blow – Contributing fashion editor-at-large

== Other editions ==
Country	Circulation Dates	Editor-in-Chief	Start year	End year
Hong Kong (Hong Kong Tatler)	1977–mid 1980s	William Guy Alexander Wayte	1977	at least 1986
Russia (Tatler Russia)	2008–2022	Victoria Davydova	2008	2010
Russia (Tatler Russia)	2008–2022	Ksenia Solovieva	2010	2021
Russia (Tatler Russia)	2008–2022	Arian Romanovskiy	2021	2022

== See also ==
- Tatler Asia, for the no longer associated Asian editions
