= Colin Valdar =

British newspaper editor

Colin Valdar (18 December 1918 – 11 January 1996) was a British newspaper editor.

Valdar studied at Haberdashers' Aske's Boys' School, then in Hampstead. He worked as a freelance journalist from 1935 to 39, then served with the Royal Engineers during World War II. In 1942, he became features editor with the Sunday Pictorial, soon moving to become assistant editor. In 1946, he moved to the Daily Express, again as features editor, and in 1951, they too promoted Valdar to assistant editor. In 1953, Valdar returned to the Sunday Pictorial as editor, serving until 1959. For last two years of his tenure, he was also a director of the publishing company. He was able to raise circulation to five million copies per issue.

In 1959, Valdar became editor of the Daily Sketch, serving three years in the post. He was also appointed to the council of the Commonwealth Press Union. In 1964, he briefly served on the board of Liberal News, the official Liberal Party newspaper but, the following year, he worked with his wife Jill and brother Stewart to set up a weekly journal for the newspaper industry, which soon became the Press Gazette. Valdar took the title of publisher, but remained strongly involved with supervising the content. The family retired in 1983.

Media offices
Preceded by Hugh Cudlipp	Editor of the Sunday Pictorial; 1953–1959	Succeeded by Lee Howard
Preceded by Bert Gunn	Editor of the Daily Sketch; 1959–1962	Succeeded by Howard French
