= Roy Wright (journalist) =

British newspaper editor

Roy Wright was the editor of British newspaper the Daily Express for seventeen months between 1976 and 1977. Wright had been promoted from a previous position as deputy editor at the Evening Standard. During his tenure, the Daily Express was converted from broadsheet to tabloid format. Shortly after the paper was purchased by Victor Matthews in June 1977, Wright was replaced with Derek Jameson.

Media offices
Preceded by Alastair Burnet	Editor of The Daily Express; 1976 – August 1977	Succeeded by Derek Jameson
