= Bute House Preparatory School for Girls =

Bute House Preparatory School

Location
- Luxemburg Gardens; London, W6 7EA; England; 51.49601°N 0.22205°W

Information
- Type: Preparatory day school
- Established: 1958
- Founder: Worshipful Company of Mercers
- Local authority: Hammersmith and Fulham
- Department for Education URN: 100368 Tables
- Ofsted: Reports
- Chair of Governors: Susan Bailes
- Head: Sian Bradshaw
- Gender: Girls
- Age: 4 to 11
- Enrolment: 310~
- Colours: Green and Navy blue
- Website: butehouse.org

Bute House Preparatory School for Girls is a private day school for girls aged 4 to 11 at Brook Green in the London Borough of Hammersmith and Fulham.

== History ==
Like the nearby St Paul's School and its affiliated schools, it was founded and is under the trusteeship of the Worshipful Company of Mercers. It has links with another Mercer school St Paul's Girls' School and uses some of their sports facilities.

Bute House was founded in 1958 and became single-sex during the 1990s. The school celebrated its 50th anniversary in 2008. Each year, the school's "birthday" is celebrated with a tradition in which girls dress up.

Central to the school campus is what used to be a now-iconic copper beech tree which has been in existence since the 19th century. It survived the Blitz and the land around it was used by locals for "victory gardens" during the World Wars. When the school was established, the new school buildings were built around the tree. In 2008, the original beech tree was cut down due to a fungal infection. The remaining stump was carved into a memorial and a new tree was planted in its place. The current school logo features the beech tree.

== Admissions ==
The 4+ entry (Reception) into Lower School is by ballot while all other entry ages are by individual assessment. Girls with a sibling already attending the school are allowed in without having to get through the ballot.

== Notable people ==
- Dixie Egerickx, actress
- Kate Reardon, journalist
- Alice Thomson, journalist
