= Oluwole Omofemi =

Nigerian painter and artist

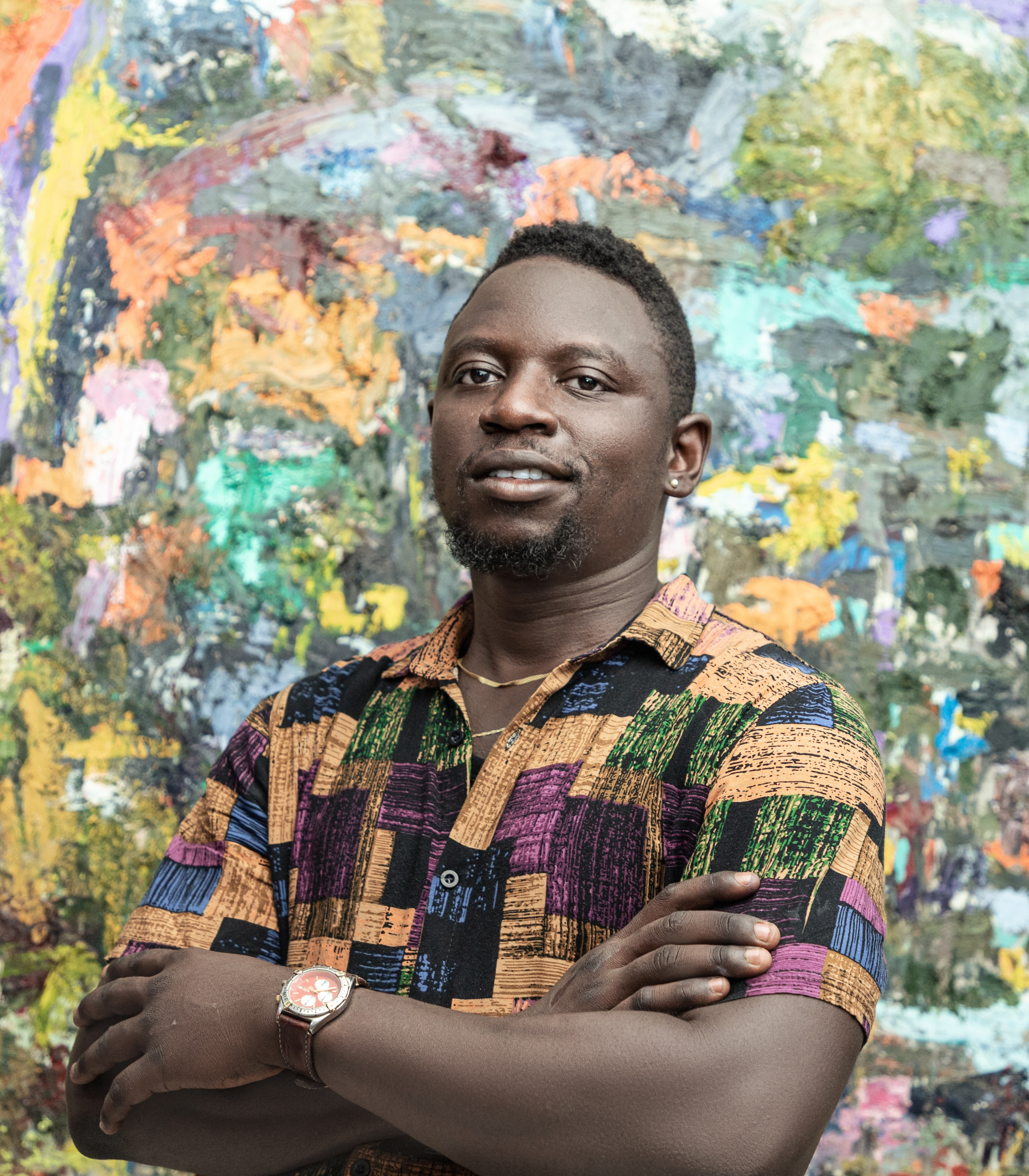
- Omofemi in his art studio in Ibadan, Nigeria
- Born: Godwin Adekunle Oluwole Omofemi; June 2, 1988 (age 38); Ibadan, Oyo State, Nigeria
- Education: The Polytechnic, Ibadan (HND)
- Occupations: artist; curator
- Years active: 2012–present
- Notable work: The last commissioned painting of Queen Elizabeth II

Oluwole Omofemi (born Godwin Oluwole Omofemi on 2 June 1988) is a Nigerian artist and curator based in Ibadan, Oyo State, Nigeria. He is mostly known for painting the last commissioned painting of Queen Elizabeth II before her death. He has held several solo and joint exhibitions both in Nigeria and abroad.

== Background and education ==
Omofemi is from Edo State, southern Nigeria. He was born and spent most of his childhood with his maternal grandfather in Ekotedo community, Ibadan - the third largest city in Nigeria by population. This endeared him to his grandfather who accepted him wholeheartedly and led him to bear his grandfather's name “Adekunle” which means “the crown or royalty fills up the family” in Yoruba language. A part of his growing years was in Agenebode, Etsako with his mother after his parents split up when he was younger. He started painting since childhood, having been influenced by the environment he grew up in to explore his artistic talent. He was always a keen observer of his environment since his growing years and had bouts of loneliness and this has ended up being a great asset in his artistic career. He has two younger sisters. In his early years, Omofemi began hawking beer and using a portion of his earnings to purchase drawing books. As his beer business grew, he obtained a wheelbarrow to facilitate it. He received informal artistic training from a fellow artist, which helped him refine his skills. Omofemi's talent was also acknowledged at his Junior Secondary School, Community Grammar School in Mokola, Ibadan, where he was recognized as one of the best artists. He then established a kiosk to showcase his miniatures. He attended The Polytechnic, Ibadan for his higher education, earning a National Diploma in 2012 and a Higher National Diploma in painting in 2015. He then proceeded to partake in the National Youth Service Corps (NYSC) program from November 2016, passing out in 2017. For his primary and secondary education, he attended Saviour Apostolic Primary School, Ekotedo and Community Grammar School, Mokola, Ibadan from 1995 to 2000 and from 2001 to 2007 respectively.

== Career ==
Omofemi held his first solo exhibition titled “Iriri”, which translates to “Experience” from Yoruba in 2019 at the Alexis Gallery, Lagos. In 2020, Omofemi held his exhibition titled “The Way We Are”. The exhibition which was made up of seventeen oil and acrylic paintings on canvas was held at the Signature African Art's Mayfair Gallery in London. In 2021, he also held the “In Our Days” exhibition in the above named theatre due to the success enjoyed by his exhibition held in the same location the previous year. 2021 also had him display his work in the Out of Africa Gallery in Barcelona in an exhibition titled “Emancipation”. He has had art exhibitions in art galleries in Belgium, Italy, France, Spain, Ghana, United Kingdom, United States and Nigeria. His works have been sold in auctions houses Christie's and Phillips. Having been introduced to the editor of Tatler Richard Dennen by rugby player and art collector Maro Itoje, in May 2022, Omofemi was commissioned by Tatler magazine to make a painting of the late Queen Elizabeth II. The painting covered the special platinum jubilee edition of the magazine. This painting was to be the last commissioned painting of her before her death.

His most expensive painting till date, “The Invader”, sold for US$189,000. With other of his paintings including “Providence” and “Yesterday Has Gone” selling for US$169,900 and US$151,200 respectively.

He pointed out Tope Fatunmbi and Ebenezer Akinola as his mentors.

== Artistic style ==
His signature style includes incorporating the Afro hairstyle, baldness, and tribal markings in his paintings into his contemporary figurative and portrait paintings. He does this as an intrinsic way of capturing femininity and the African identity and African heritage while running natural commentary on both its history and contemporary times. According to Okay Africa, this is his way of portraying an African “emblem of liberation, identity, and power” and is “a way of conserving African heritage and tradition”, preserving afrocentrism. He also iterated in an interview with The Sun that:

The hair is special to me just as you have rightly said because of its unique features and symbolic representation. The incident which led to my indulgence in painting hair as a subject matter, particularly afro, began in the late 1960s and early 70s when the civil rights exponents drew more attention to the love-yourself gospel which helped to project confidence, beauty and sparkle to the perception of blacks and their diasporic identity.

His works are viewed as Afrocentric. Another of his style is trying not just to paint but to capture the ‘essence’ of his subject. He ensures to make his paintings exude an aura that is human like. He also draws his artistic inspiration from his growing up days in Ibadan. Citing the serenity and free flowing way of life in the city makes sure that his inspiration is never disrupted by physical factors. He does contemporary art and abstract art as well. In his painting of the Queen of England, he painted her with black hair to capture both youth - as opposed to grey hair - as well as integrate his signature style into the painting. He also uses the pop art palette for his signature color range and mix, forming a major part of his color theory.

== Exhibitions and paintings ==
=== Solo shows ===
Year	Work Title	Art Gallery	Location
2022	A Woman's Worth	OOA Gallery	Barcelona, Spain
2021	In our days	Signature African Art	London, UK
2021	Self Addressed	Jeffrey Deitch Gallery, curated by Kehinde Wiley	Los Angeles, US
2020	The Way we were	Signature African Art	London, UK
2019	Iriri (Experience)	Allexis Gallery	Lagos, Nigeria

=== Group shows ===
Year	Work Title	Art Gallery	Location
2022	The Queen	Sotheby's Group Show	London, UK
2022	Volta New York Art Fair	OOA Gallery	New York, US
2022	4000 Ans	Curated by Destinee Ross-Sutton – Wall House Museum	Saint Barthélemy, France
2021	1-54 London Art Fair	OOA Gallery	London, UK
2021	Self Addressed	Jeffrey Deith Gallery, curated by Kehinde Wiley	Los Angeles, US
2021	1-54 New York	OOA Gallery	New York, US
2021	Black Excellence	Ross-Sutton Gallery	Miami, US
2021	Artexpo (New York 2021)	TAAG Gallery	New York, US
2021	Emancipation with REWA	OOA Gallery	Barcelona, Spain
2020	Can't stop our flow	JM Gallery	London, UK
2020	Locality and the Status Quo	Pacers Art Gallery	Lagos, Nigeria
2020	Say my Name	Signature African Art	London, UK
2020	Piasa Auction		Paris, France
2019	Rise Up	Signature African Art	London, UK
2019	Mayfair	Signature African Art	London, UK
2019	Fashion and Art Show		Belgium
2019	Face & Phases	Terrakulture Art Gallery	Lagos, Nigeria
2019	Impact Artist Fair	Eko Atlantic City	Lagos, Nigeria
2019	Second Ibadan Affordable Art Fair		Ibadan, Nigeria
2019	Sogal Art Auction	Signature Beyond	Lagos, Nigeria
2019	Bald is Beautiful	Alexis Gallery	Lagos, Nigeria
2019	Starting Point		Lagos, Nigeria
2018	Sogal Art Auction	Signature Beyond	Lagos, Nigeria
2018	New Horizon	Discova Art Centre	Port Harcourt, Nigeria
2018	Fair & Square	Alexis Gallery	Lagos, Nigeria
2018	Next of Kin	Thought Pyramid Gallery	Lagos, Nigeria
2016	Face & Phases	Terrakulture Art Gallery	Lagos, Nigeria
2015	The Return of the Slave		Accra, Ghana
2015	Art for Heart		Lagos, Nigeria
2015	Curore di Donna	World Art Exhibition	Italy
2015	Face & Phases	Terrakulture Art Gallery	Lagos, Nigeria
2014	Emergency		Lagos, Nigeria
2013	Life in my city Festival	Alliance Française	Ibadan, Nigeria
2013	Unity	National Museum	Ibadan, Nigeria

== Philanthropy ==
In 2021, he started the Oluwole Omofemi Foundation. In 2022, made donations foodstuffs and other aid to widows in the Ekotedo community in Ibadan, Oyo State; the community in which he matured. He did this remembrance of his late mother. Another facet of his philanthropy was creating a yuletide program called “Ijewuru Day”. The scheme brings youths together to motivate them and also has an eating competition segment with prizes to be won.

In a meeting with the deputy governor of Oyo State. He spoke of his intention to initiate a project for his alma mater, The Ibadan Polytechnic.

== Personal life ==
He owns a two-room studio in Ibadan where he has apprentices. He advised upcoming artists to be wary of selling their art works without the knowledge of their lawyers or their affiliated galleries.
