= Kate Reardon =

British journalist and author (born 1968)

Kate Reardon (born 1968 in New York City, US) is a British journalist and author who was the editor of Tatler magazine from 2011 until resigning in December 2017.

== Early life ==
Reardon was born in New York to architect Patrick Reardon. She attended Garden House School, Bute House Preparatory School for Girls, Cheltenham Ladies' College and Stowe School. Reardon did not take up a place to study at the University of Exeter, choosing instead to begin a career in journalism.

== Career ==
Reardon began her career on the US edition of Vogue magazine, and was made fashion director of the British Tatler magazine at the age of 21. Reardon remained in this position for 9 years, before gaining the attention of Vanity Fair editor Graydon Carter, who gave her the job of contributing editor in 1999, in which she spent eleven years in the role. Reardon has also contributed to a number of UK national newspapers and written three columns in The Times, who named her one of Britain's best writers.

In 2007, Reardon launched her own website called TopTips.com, giving "real tips for real women". and spawned a column in the Daily Mail and a regular slot on GMTV. Also in 2007, Reardon was named one of London's 1,000 Most Influential People by the Evening Standard.

Reardon was appointed the editor of Tatler on 20 December 2010, and was the 17th editor since the magazine's relaunch in 1901.

In March 2018, Reardon was announced as the new editor-in-chief of The Times' luxury quarterly magazine, Luxx.

== Personal life ==
Reardon has previously dated Rupert Fairfax, aide to Prince Charles, actor Samuel West, former Spectator editor Matthew d'Ancona, and former executive M&S chairman Sir Stuart Rose. In 2013, she married bloodstock agent Charles Gordon-Watson, with whom she has two children.

A keen horse-rider, after buying her own horse she took part in Glorious Goodwood's first Celebrity Ladies Race.

Reardon is a major fundraiser for Cancer Research UK and was elected a Member in 2007. Her fundraising efforts have included hosting the Great Girls' lunch at the Westbury hotel.

== Books ==
- Top Tips for Girls (Headline, 2008)
- Top Tips for Life (Headline, 2010)
- Your Mother Was Right (Three Rivers Press, 2010)

Media offices
Preceded by Catherine Ostler	Editor of Tatler; 2011–2017	Succeeded by Richard Dennen
