= Collin Brooks =

British journalist, writer, and broadcaster

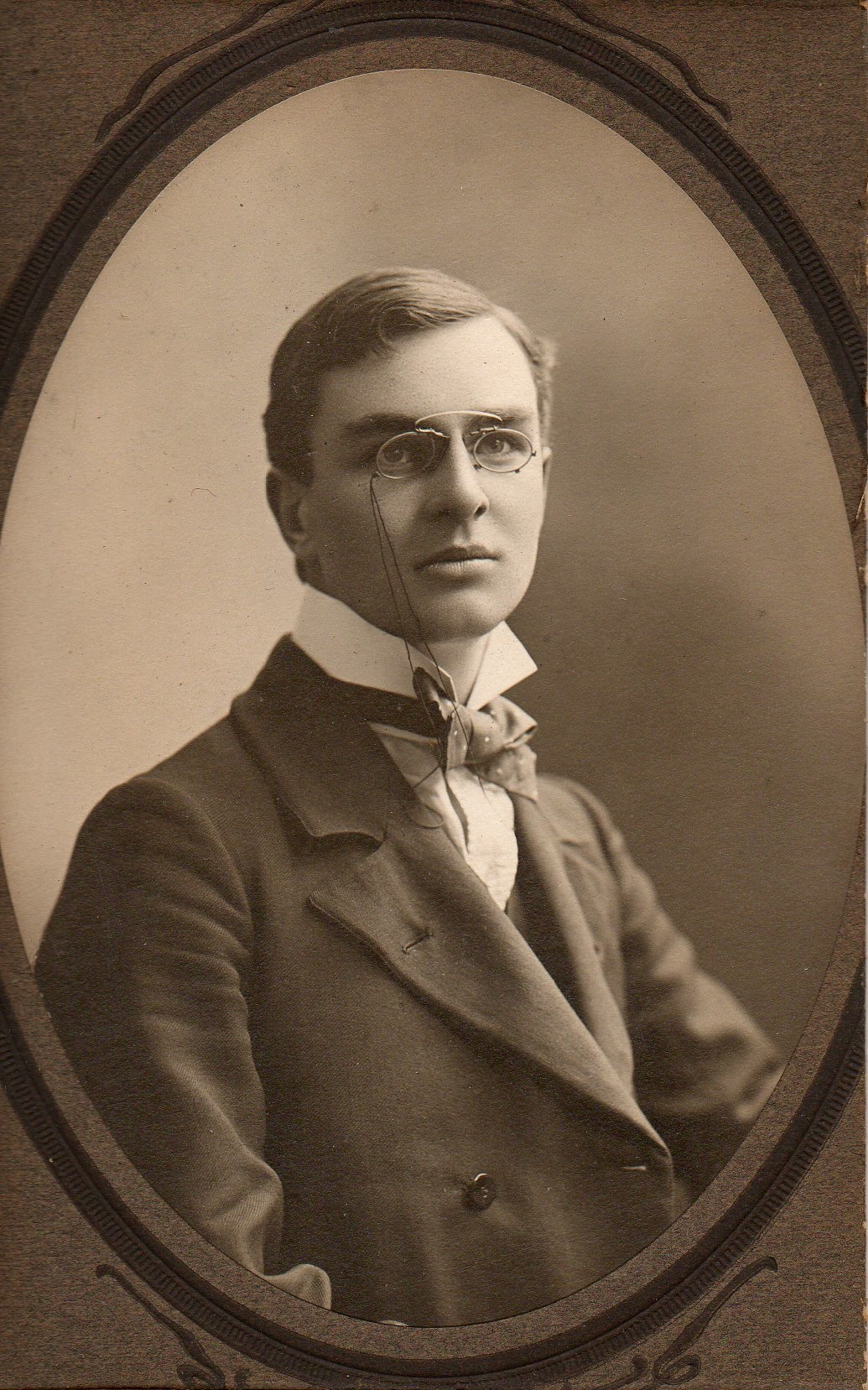
- Brooks as a young man, in 1911
- Born: William Collin Brooks; 22 December 1893
- Died: 6 April 1959
- Other name: CB
- Occupations: Journalist, broadcaster, and author
- Spouse: Lillian (Dilly) Brooks (1916–1959)
- Children: Barbara Brooks; Rosemary Brooks (1920–1971); Vivian Brooks (1922–2003); Austen Brooks (1924–1986); Edward "Tich" Brooks (1928–2010)

Collin Brooks (22 December 1893 – 6 April 1959), frequently known as "CB", was a British journalist, writer, and broadcaster. In 1913 he founded the Manchester Press Agency. In 1915 he joined the British Army, where he was awarded the Military Cross as a 2nd Lieutenant. After the war, he worked for many newspapers from 1921 until 1953, becoming chairman and editor of Truth for 12 years. His later career moved from journalism to broadcasting, and he participated in Any Questions and The Brains Trust for BBC Radio.

== Early life and background ==
Born William Collin Brooks he was the son of William Edward Brooks (1864–1914) and Isabella (née Thomas), herself the daughter of Griffith Thomas and Isabella (née Harrison – a descendant of Colonel Thomas Harrison of Cromwell's New Model Army). He was born and brought up in the north of England, spent only seven years in formal education, and after a short period as a trainee accountant became a commercial traveller for various companies, from the age of fifteen to twenty.

In 1913 he founded the Manchester Press Agency. Brooks' father died only weeks before the outbreak of World War I, and his mother Isabella died eighteen months later, on Christmas Eve 1915. Two weeks later their son married Lillian Susanna Marsden, and the couple had five children: Barbara (who died in infancy); Rosemary Collin Brooks (1920–1971), whose career included a period working for MI5; Vivian Collin Brooks (1922–2003) – a journalist who wrote a number of detective books under the pen-name "Osmington Mills"; William Austen Brooks (1924–1986), also a journalist: and Edward Clarke Brooks (1928–2010) who became an actor and wrote a number of short stories.

== In the war ==
On 20 November 1915, Collin Brooks joined the British Army, and after a period driving tanks transferred to the machine gun corps. As a 2nd Lieutenant, he was awarded the Military Cross, his citation reading: “For conspicuous gallantry and devotion to duty during the attack across the Piave on 27 October 1918. This officer led his four guns forward under heavy shell and machine gun fire with the forward waves of the infantry. On arrival at the objective, by his skilful handling of his guns, he formed a defensive flank and in spite of heavy casualties he maintained his position. The coolness and energy of this officer was, throughout the action, a fine example to the men under him.”

His own field notes — taken from his pocket book — of this event run as follows:

"Have reached C. Fighera with two gun teams and am held by hostile MG [machine gun] with which we are dealing. Teams were considerably weakened by rifle & MG fire. Fording the river and further (MG) support on left boundary line is requested. No counter attacks have developed & local resistance is being rapidly overcome. Our line was badly broken by initial resistance and by natural features and lateral communication is poor." His next report states that nine men were wounded; this was followed by a report at 12:00 hrs: "At 11:00 I took over C. ARAGIOTTO and consolidated it into a double MG strongpoint firing W. and N. I am handing this over to No 2 Sec Select and am proceeding north."

== Journalism ==
His war service was followed by an increased awareness and involvement in politics and journalism. In 1921 he was employed by the Liverpool Courier; in 1923 he joined the Yorkshire Post, and moved in 1928 to their London office. This was followed by a move to the position of editor of the Financial News later that year. In 1933 he moved to the Sunday Dispatch, which began his long involvement with Harold Sidney Harmsworth, 1st Viscount Rothermere. He was shortly elevated to the position of Editor of the Sunday Dispatch.

With his work for Rothermere, the family spent time living both in London and also in Norfolk – in a house called "The Mount" on Rothermere's Stody estate; the relationship between Brooks and Rothermere was sufficiently close that he was named as literary legatee in Rothermere's will.

He later worked on a number of other papers, being from 1941 to 1953 chairman and Editor of Truth, an exposé magazine of political and society issues, and wrote the magazine's "Letter to America" on a regular basis. He joined the Daily Express Group in 1953 and continued at the same time as chairman and leader writer of The Statist. He was also a ghost-writer for a number of people, and many political speeches and white papers were influenced to some extent by him.

== Other interests ==
He was a member of a number of clubs, including the Savage Club, and the book "Brother Savages and Guests" by Percy V. Bradshaw includes some illustrations by Brooks. Other clubs of which he was a member were The Carlton, the Royal Thames Yacht Club, the City Livery, the Reform and the Press. Collin Brooks was a prolific writer, with over fifty books to his name, from authoritative works on finance and legal cases, through literary novels under his pen-name "Barnaby Brook" and two volumes of poetry, to what he called his "shockers" – detective stories which introduced such memorable characters as eccentric amateur sleuth Lord Tweed, Raeburn Steel, Dan'l Forray and his twin daughters Jo and Jack, Inspector "Doleful" Debenham, and the unforgettable Oswald Swete McTavish.

In addition to his published works he produced, throughout his life, his own Journals. The Journals cover a period of some three decades, and run to millions of words. For much of the time he had three or more literary works – not including the Journals – "on the go" at any one time, which one he worked on on any given day depending on his mood.

His later career expanded from journalism into broadcasting, where he was a participant in Any Questions and of The Brains Trust, both for BBC Radio, and did a regular stint as "Northcountryman" on radio broadcasts.

He was a man who had an extensive circle of friends, acquaintances and correspondents.

== Death ==
He died on 6 April 1959; T. S. Eliot, a family friend, gave an address at Collin Brooks' memorial service at St Bride's Church, Fleet Street, London in 1959, which was attended by people from many walks of life with whom he had come into contact during his career.

Media offices
Preceded by William Brittain	Editor of the Sunday Dispatch; 1936–1938	Succeeded by Charles Eade

== Bibliography ==
- Bradshaw, Percy Venner (1958), 'Brother savages and guests': A history of the Savage Club, 1857–1957, W.H.Allen, ASIN B0000CK069
- Brooks, Collin (1950), Tavern Talk, James Barrie
