= Louis Kirby =

British newspaper editor

Louis Kirby (30 November 1928–14 October 2006) was a British newspaper editor.

In 1971, the Sketch merged with the Mail. Sketch editor David English was appointed as editor of the merged newspaper, leaving Kirby as acting editor of the last editions of the Sketch. He then moved to join English, becoming deputy editor of the Mail.

== Early life and career ==
Kirby was born in Liverpool and grew up in Coalbrookdale. His first job was as a reporter on the Wolverhampton Express and Star, then in 1949 he moved to Bermuda where he worked at The Royal Gazette. In 1951 he returned to Britain to work as a freelance, then joined the Daily Mail in 1953. He became the Mail's lobby correspondent, then in 1962 became chief reporter with the Daily Sketch, and in 1969 was promoted to Executive Editor. Kirby became editor of the London daily, the Evening News in 1974, and completed its transformation from broadsheet to tabloid. Negotiations to merge the Evening News with its competitor, the Evening Standard began in 1976, but failed to make progress due to a dispute over who should edit a merged paper. Circulation of the Evening News continued to fall under Kirby's editorship, and in 1979, the paper stopped publishing a Saturday edition.

The two papers finally merged in November 1980 to produce the New Standard, soon named the Evening Standard once more. Kirby was appointed editor, and made more than 100 journalists redundant, most from the Evening News. He stepped down in 1986, becoming Editorial Director of Mail Newspapers. From 1988 to 1993 he was political consultant to the Daily Mail, then until 2003 he was editor of the UK Mail, a weekly news digest.

== Personal life ==
Kirby was married three times, producing five children with his first wife, two with his second and two more with his third.

Media offices
Preceded by David English	Acting Editor of the Daily Sketch; 1971	Succeeded by Position abolished
Preceded by Bruce Rothwell	Deputy Editor of the Daily Mail; 1971–1974	Succeeded by ?
Preceded by John Gold	Editor of the Evening News; 1974–1980	Succeeded by Position abolished
Preceded by Charles Wintour	Editor of the Evening Standard; 1980–1986	Succeeded by John Leese
