= George Tolhurst =

English composer

George Tolhurst (5 June 1827 – 18 January 1877) was an English composer, resident from 1852 to 1866 in Australia.

Born in Maidstone, Kent, George emigrated to Melbourne with his father, where he practised as a teacher of music. He returned to England in 1866, and died in Barnstaple in 1877. His one large-scale composition, the oratorio Ruth, was first performed in Prahran in Melbourne in 1864, and repeated in London in 1868. Tolhurst is therefore notable as the composer of the first oratorio composed in the colony of Victoria. Though well received by early audiences, Ruth was generally derided for bathos and technical ineptitude in the musical press, and by the early 20th century was generally regarded as the worst oratorio ever composed. It was revived in a re-orchestrated and abridged version at the Royal Albert Hall, London, in 1973, conducted by Antony Hopkins and revived in another format in 2007.

"The Heart That's True"
by W. H. Tolhurst, lyrics by English poet Eliza Cook

== Works ==
- 1858 "O, Call It By Some Better Name"
- 1864 "The Post Galop"
- 1864 "Christmas in Australia"
- 1864 Ruth

== Recordings ==
- 2007 Ruth, Stephen Cleobury, conductor; Cambridge, Pure Sound P2007; 2 CDs
