= Howard French (British journalist) =

British journalist

Howard French (23 November 1912 – 24 October 2008) was a British newspaper editor.

== Biography ==
Born in Southgate, French grew up as a Roman Catholic and studied at Ealing Priory School. He joined the Sunday Dispatch as a reporter in 1936, and soon discovered that the environmentalist Grey Owl, supposedly a Native American, had been born in England as Archie Belaney. He served in the Royal Naval Reserve during World War II, then returned to the Dispatch.

French later moved to the Daily Sketch and in 1962 became its editor. He served until 1969, when he joined the board of Associated Newspapers. He was given control of editorial development, and in 1971 he co-ordinated the merger of the Sketch with the Daily Mail. He retired in 1977, but was involved in the 1982 launch of the Mail on Sunday.

Media offices
Preceded by Colin Valdar	Editor of the Daily Sketch; 1962–1969	Succeeded by David English
