= Percy Elland =

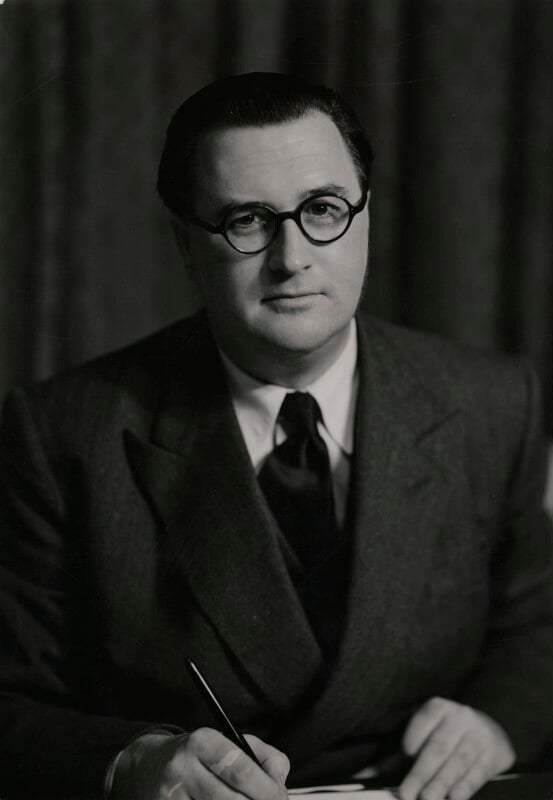
Elland in 1950

Percy Elland (7 October 1908–3 March 1960) was an English newspaper editor.

Born in Doncaster, Elland attended Doncaster Grammar School before entering journalism. In 1952, he became editor of the Evening Standard, serving until 1959, but making few changes. He then became a director and managing editor of the Standard, before dying the following year.

Media offices
Preceded by Bert Gunn	Editor of the Evening Standard; 1952–1959	Succeeded by Charles Wintour
