= The Evening News (London newspaper) =

English newspaper (1881–1980)

Evening News
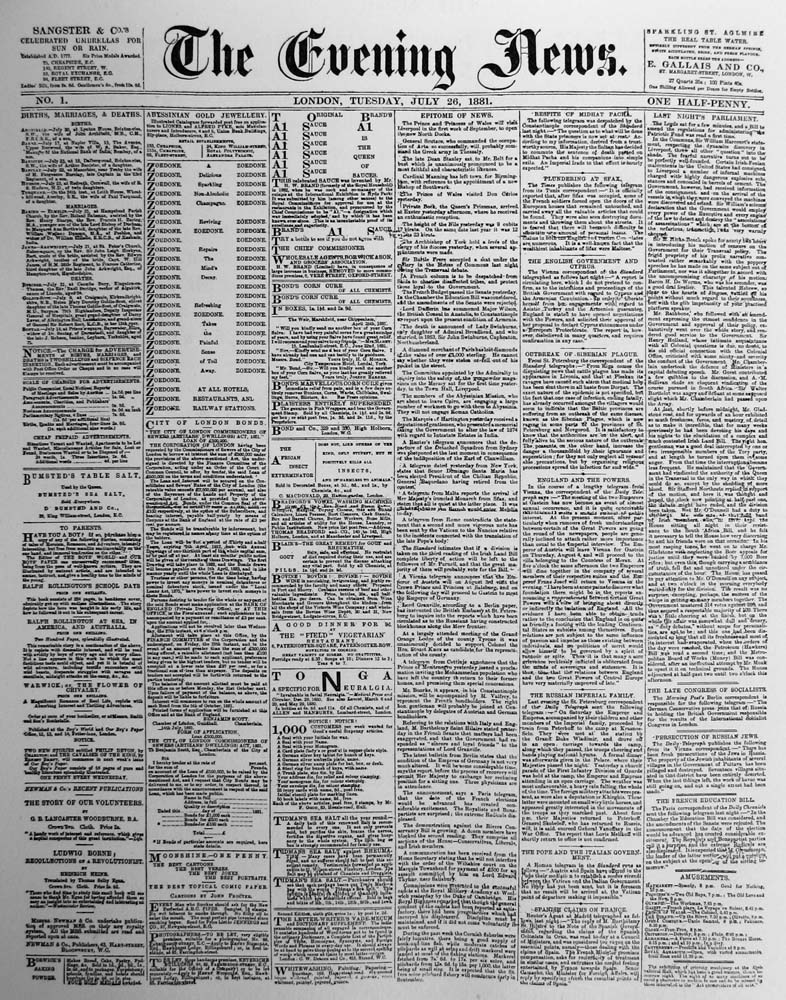
- The first issue of The Evening News, published on 26 July 1881
- Owner: Associated Newspapers
- Editor: Martin Fradd (1881–1882); Charles Williams (1882–1883)
- Founded: (1) 26 July 1881 (2) 25 February 1987
- Ceased publication: (1) 31 October 1980 (2) 30 October 1987

The Evening News, earlier styled as The Evening News, and from 1889 to 1894 The Evening News and Post, was an evening newspaper published in London from 1881 to 1980, reappearing briefly in 1987. It became highly popular under the control of the Harmsworth brothers. For a long time it maintained the largest daily sale of any evening newspaper in London. After financial struggles and falling sales, it was eventually merged with its long-time rival the Evening Standard in 1980. The newspaper was revived for an eight-month period in 1987.

== Early history ==
The newspaper was founded by Coleridge Kennard and Harry Marks. The first issue appeared on 26 July 1881. It was the first popular evening paper in London. It was priced at one halfpenny, distinguishing itself from the more serious penny papers such as The Times. The first issues were printed on light blue paper, and later editions on yellow and green paper.

The rivalry between halfpenny papers in the late 19th century was fierce, and almost ended the Evening News. According to some sources the paper was losing £40,000 a year. The brothers Alfred and Harold Harmsworth bought the paper for £25,000 in 1894.

In 1888 Alfred had founded a paper called Answers, which was modelled after another popular paper called Tit-Bits. Harold gave up his clerk's job to handle the business side of the papers, while Alfred effectively controlled the papers with great success. Alfred later became ennobled as Lord Northcliffe, and Harold as Lord Rothermere. The brothers started several papers, of which the Daily Mail became the most influential.

Under editor Kennedy Jones, the Evening News was one of the papers that transformed the English press with their so-called 'new journalism'. This meant that the papers were aimed at a wider general public than the traditional ones, such as The Times.

== 20th century ==
Poster stamp for The Evening News, c. 1910

The Evening News became one of the leading papers in England under the control of Northcliffe. Evening newspapers were not considered to be good investments in 1900, and most of the London newspapers were losing money. At the same time the Evening News was making profit of £50,000 a year.

The circulation numbers of English newspapers between the 1850s and the 1930s can only be guessed at. (The newspapers would not publish exact figures except in their advertising, which cannot be trusted.) Some authors have carefully estimated that in 1910 the circulation of the Evening News was 300,000. Among the halfpenny evening papers, that would amount to a share of 35.7 per cent. The estimate for the average circulation of July 1914 is approximately 600,000, which would have made it the biggest evening paper in London.

During the First World War (1914–1918) the paper was widely criticised for its views on women. Women were now being treated with equality in mind. Other newspapers such as the Daily Sketch had a much more neutral approach to the introduction of women en masse into workplaces in place of men, which took place owing to the military conscription that began in 1916.

Northcliffe died in 1922. Subsequently, control of Associated Newspapers, including the Daily Mail, Evening News, Weekly Dispatch and Overseas Daily Mail, was bought by his brother Harold. After 1936, Harold's son Esmond took over as chairman of Associated Newspapers.

Ninety-four short stories by crime fiction writer Will Scott were published in the paper between 1952 and 1964. In 1954, it was the first paper in the world to publish the Moomin comic strip by Finnish artist Tove Jansson.

In 1960, as part of the same takeover that merged the News Chronicle into the Daily Mail, the Evening News incorporated another London evening paper, The Star. For some years the merged paper was called The Evening News and Star.

== Demise and reappearance ==
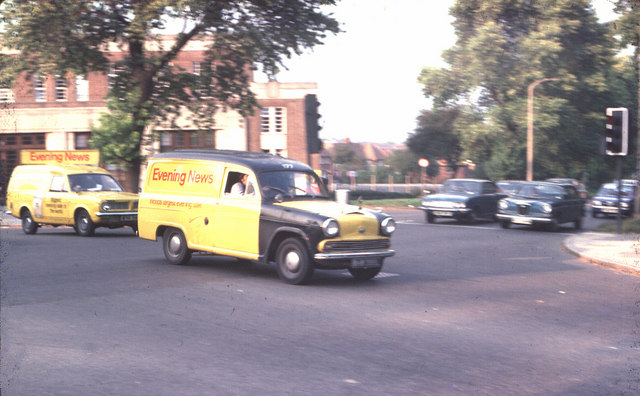
Two Evening News delivery vans cross the North Circular Road in Finchley, September 1975.

Although it had been the biggest evening paper in London over several decades, by the 1970s the Evening News was struggling with financial problems and falling sales, with television eating away its advertising market share. It switched from broadsheet to tabloid in September 1974, and stopped printing on Saturdays in June 1979. In October 1980, Associated Newspapers announced that the newspaper would be closed at the end of the month. The last issue was on 31 October 1980. The paper was merged with its long-time rival the Evening Standard. For some time the resulting paper was called the New Standard. The name Evening News continued to feature on the titlepiece of the Evening Standard until the relaunch of the Evening News in the late 1980s.

The Evening News reappeared for a few months in 1987 when it was launched by the Evening Standard's owner Associated Newspapers in order to counter Robert Maxwell's London Daily News; this sparked a price war, by the end of which the Evening News was being sold at 5p, while copies of the London Daily News were 10p. The revived newspaper was edited by Lori Miles, one of the first female editors in Fleet Street. Following the collapse of the London Daily News in July, the Evening News continued for a further three months as a separate brand from the Evening Standard, catering for a more "female and South London" readership before being re-absorbed into its sister publication and former rival on 30 October 1987.

== Editors ==
1881: Martin Fradd
1882: Charles Williams
1883: Frank Harris
1887: I. Rubie
1889: W. R. Lawson
1889: J. H. Copleston
1894: Kennedy Jones
1896: Walter J. Evans
1922: Charles Beattie
1924: Frank Fitzhugh
1943: Guy Schofield
1950: J. Marshall
1954: Reg Willis
1967: John Gold
1974: Louis Kirby
1987: Lori Miles

== Former journalists ==
- Ken Follett (born 1949), bestselling thriller writer
- Charles Graves

== See also ==
- History of British newspapers

== Sources ==
- Blake, R. (2004). "Harmsworth, Esmond Cecil, second Viscount Rothermere (1898–1978)". Oxford Dictionary of National Biography. Accessed March 20, 2007.
- Engel, M. (1996). Tickle the Public: One Hundred Years of the Popular Press. Gollancz, London.
- Herd, H. (1952). The March of Journalism: The Story of the British Press from 1622 to the Present Day. Allen & Unwin, London.
- Lee, A.J. (1976). The Origins of the Popular Press in England 1855–1914. Croom Helm, London.
- Morison, S. (1932). The English Newspaper: Some Account of the Physical Development of Journals Printed in London Between 1622 & the Present Day. Cambridge University Press, Cambridge.
- Pound, R. & Harmsworth, G. (1959). Northcliffe. Cassell, London.
