= James Harmer =

English solicitor and alderman

James Harmer (1777–1853) was an English solicitor, involved in the investigation of miscarriages of justice, radical politics, and local government in London, where he served as an alderman. He served as a model for Jaggers, the Charles Dickens character from Great Expectations.

James Harmer appears in a series of historical financial crime novels written by Susan Grossey: Fatal Forgery, The Man in the Canary Waistcoat, and Worm in the Blossom.

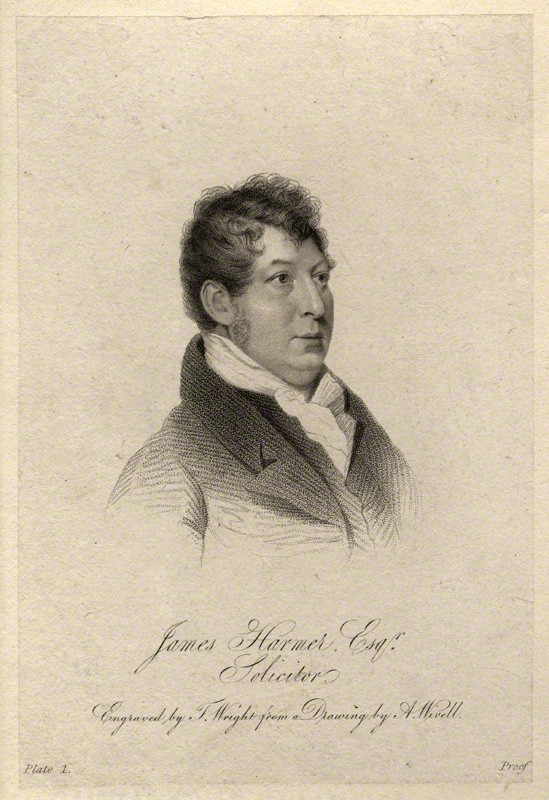
James Harmer

== Early life ==
Harmer was the son of a Spitalfields weaver, and was left an orphan at age 10. He was articled to an attorney in 1792, but left his office on making an early marriage. He was afterwards transferred to Messrs. Fletcher & Wright of Bloomsbury, and practised for himself in 1799.

== Legal reformer ==
Harmer's practice was mainly in the criminal courts, and experience there made him an advocate of reform in criminal procedure. He came across police conspiracies to commit perjury, to secure convictions. In 1816 he was one of those who exposed the thief-taking scandal, and the corruption of the system of rewards.

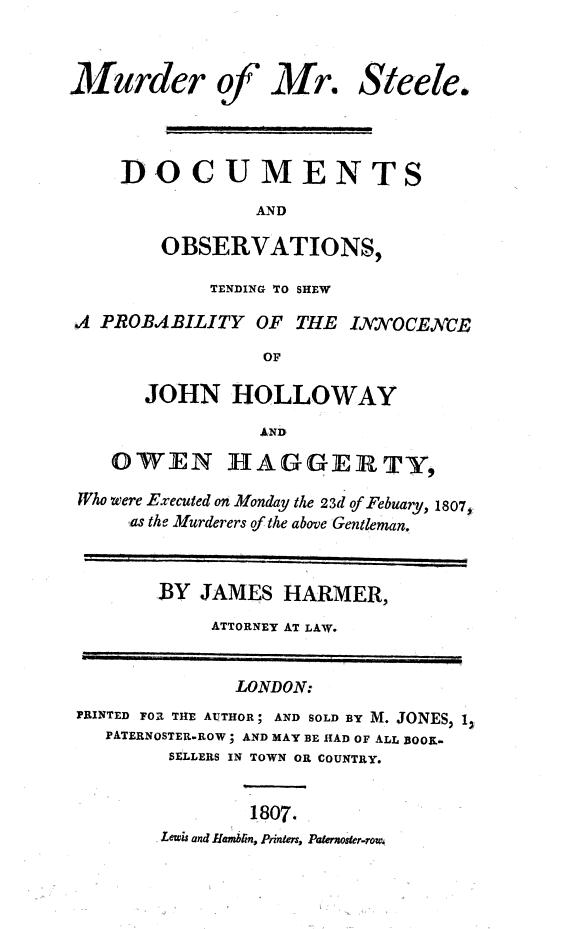
Title page of James Harmer's 1807 work claiming a miscarriage of justice in the case of John Holloway and Owen Haggerty

The parliamentary committee for the reform of the criminal law took Harmer's evidence; and Sir James Mackintosh said it was as telling as any they had heard. He exposed the delinquency of witnesses, and especially the mode of obtaining evidence against Holloway and Haggerty, who were executed in 1807 for the murder of Steele. He took much trouble in investigating cases where he considered that prisoners had been wrongly committed but into the 1830s, leading Old Bailey barristers, such as Charles Law and Charles Phillips, opposed the reforms Harmer was pressing, such as the right of defence counsel to make speeches.

== Radical causes ==
In the aftermath of the Invasion of Isle de France in 1810, Henry Brougham acted as defence barrister for some British prisoners who had joined the French. Harmer was their choice of solicitor.

In 1812, following the assassination of Spencer Perceval, the Prime Minister, in the House of Commons, Harmer was defending solicitor for the assailant, John Bellingham, whom Harmer sought to defend on insanity grounds, but Bellingham was ultimately found guilty and hanged.

In 1819 Harmer represented Samuel Bamford after the Peterloo massacre. In the Peterloo aftermath Harmer, and Henry Dennison of Liverpool, represented the family of John Lees of Oldham, fatally wounded, at an extended inquest starting 8 September 1819. Dennison, Harmer and Charles Pearson were thanked by the "Report on the Metropolitan and Central Committee, Appointed for the Relief of the Manchester Sufferers" for their investigations. William Hone's book The Whole Proceedings before the Coroner's Court at Oldham, which exposed the use of force at Peterloo, relied heavily on Harmer's work with witness testimony.

In 1820 Harmer took on the defence of Cato Street conspirators. In 1820, also, he was brought in by the defence at the treason trial of James Wilson in Glasgow.

== Later life ==
In 1833 Harmer was elected alderman of the ward of Farringdon Without, which he had represented since 1826 in the common council, and gave up his lucrative legal practice. He was sheriff of London in 1834. He resigned his alderman's gown in 1840, when his election to the mayoralty was successfully opposed on the ground of his being proprietor of the Weekly Dispatch, which then advocated radical religious and political views.

Harmer took a leading part in establishing the Royal Free Hospital. He lived at Greenhithe, Kent, where he built Ingress Abbey, mainly of stone procured from old London Bridge on its demolition. He died on 12 June 1853 and was buried on the 16th in Kensal Green cemetery. He left a large fortune to his granddaughter.

== Works ==
Harmer wrote pamphlets on behalf of Holloway and Haggerty in 1807, on the case of George Mathews in 1819, and in 1825 on behalf of Edward Harris.
