= Press Gazette =

British media trade magazine founded in 1965

- Screenshot of the website in December 2024
- Editor: Dominic Ponsford
- News Editor: William Turvill
- Frequency: Online (with annual paper publications)
- Founder: Colin Valdar
- First issue: 1965; 61 years ago
- Company: Progressive Media Group
- Country: England
- Based in: London
- Language: English
- Website: pressgazette.co.uk
- ISSN: 0041-5170

Press Gazette, formerly known as UK Press Gazette, is a British trade magazine dedicated to covering trends in journalism and the media industry. First published in 1965, Press Gazette had a circulation of about 2,500 before going online-only in 2013. Published with the strapline "Future of Media", the magazine covers news about newspapers, magazines, TV, radio, and the online press, focusing on launches, closures, moves, legislation and technological advances affecting journalists.

Press Gazette is funded by subscriptions, recruitment, classified advertising and display advertising. It is owned by GlobalData, which also owns the magazines New Statesman and Spear's.

== History ==
Press Gazette was launched in November 1965 by Colin Valdar, his wife Jill, and his brother Stewart. Upon the Valdars' retirement in 1983 the magazine was sold to Timothy Benn, who sold it in 1990 to the Canadian publishing company Maclean Hunter. The magazine was sold again in 1994, this time to EMAP. Three years later the magazine was sold again, along with MediaWeek and 12 other titles, to Quantum Business Media for £14.1 million.

=== High-profile owners and closure ===
Rupert Murdoch's son-in-law Matthew Freud became the new owner of Press Gazette in May 2005, entering into partnership with former Daily Mirror editor Piers Morgan to raise around £600,000 to buy the title. The purchase was part of the break-up of Quantum Business Media by its owners, the venture-capital group ABN Amro Capital.

On 19 October 2006, Freud announced that the magazine was for sale, citing as a reason indifference in the newspaper industry to the British Press Awards. The company owned by Freud and Morgan, Press Gazette Limited, subsequently entered administrative receivership. Initially, the receivers were unable to find another buyer for the magazine, and on 24 November 2006 it closed.

=== Acquisition and relaunch ===
After the publication missed one issue, Wilmington Group plc announced on 5 December 2006 it had acquired the title. Wilmington Media editorial director Tony Loynes, a former Press Gazette editor, led the take-over. He named news editor Dominic Ponsford as editor, and the magazine moved from Fleet Street to Wilmington Media's Old Street headquarters.

Both the magazine and its website PressGazette.co.uk underwent a redesign in May 2007, including a new masthead and body font. The magazine switched from weekly to monthly publication in August 2008.

On 6 April 2009, Wilmington Group announced the May 2009 issue would be the last, but the magazine was purchased on 22 April 2009 by Mike Danson of the Progressive Media Group, shortly after he attained full control of the New Statesman, in April 2009. The Wilmington Group retained the British Press Awards.

Press Gazette went to a quarterly publication in June 2012. At the beginning of 2013 it ended print publication, keeping a weekly digital edition. A paywall was added to its website in May 2025.

== Magazine Design and Journalism Awards ==
Since about 1998, the Press Gazette award the Magazine Design and Journalism Awards in multiple categories. One source said, "They are considered the only awards which celebrate design and journalism across all magazine sectors – consumer, B2B and customer."

Awards were presented in the following categories:

- Magazine Design Awards
  - Young Designer of the Year
  - Best Designed Feature Spread
  - Best New Design/Redesign
  - Best Designed Front Cover
  - Best Use of Typography
  - Best Use of Illustration
  - Best Use of Photography
  - Magazine Designer of the Year
  - Best Designed Magazine of the Year
- Magazine Journalism Awards
  - Exclusive of the Year
  - Feature Writer of the Year
  - Interviewer of the Year
  - Columnist of the Year
  - News Reporter of the Year
  - Business Reporter of the Year
  - Production Team of the Year
  - Reviewer of the Year
  - Digital Journalist of the Year
  - Editor of the Year

== See also ==
- Editor & Publisher – covering the American newspaper industry
