= Fitzgerald Wintour =

British military officer

Major-General Fitzgerald Wintour CB CBE

Personal details
- Born: 30 December 1860 Hawerby, Lincolnshire, England
- Died: 18 June 1949 (aged 88) Poole, Dorset, England
- Spouse: Alice Jane Blanche Foster
- Children: Charles Wintour; Cordelia James, Baroness James of Rusholme
- Parent(s): Fitzgerald Wintour; Isabel Milnes Gaskell
- Relatives: Dame Anna Wintour (granddaughter); Patrick Wintour (grandson)
- Occupation: Military officer
- Awards: Order of the British Empire; Order of the Bath

Military service
- Allegiance: United Kingdom
- Branch/service: British Army
- Years of service: 1880–1918
- Rank: Major-General
- Commands: Queen's Own Royal West Kent Regiment; Royal Norfolk Regiment
- Battles/wars: Tochi Expedition; Mahdist War; Anglo-Egyptian War; Second Boer War; Western Front

Major-General Fitzgerald Wintour CB CBE (30 December 1860 – 18 June 1949) was a British Army officer who served in the Queen's Own Royal West Kent Regiment and the Royal Norfolk Regiment. Wintour was commissioned in the British Army in 1880 and fought in the Anglo-Egyptian War, the Mahdist War, the Tochi Expedition, the Second Boer War, and in World War I. He was made a Companion of the Order of the Bath and a Commander of the Order of the British Empire for his military service. Wintour was the father of newspaper editor Charles Wintour and of Cordelia James, Baroness James of Rusholme and the grandfather of Dame Anna Wintour and Patrick Wintour.

== Early life and family ==
Fitzgerald Wintour was born in 1860 to Rev. Fitzgerald Wintour and Isabel Milnes Gaskell. He was the grandson of Mary Wynn Williams-Wynn, the daughter of Charles Williams-Wynn, and Conservative politician James Milnes Gaskell of Thornes House, Wakefield, Yorkshire, and of Wenlock Abbey, Much Wenlock, Shropshire. His maternal great-grandfather was Sir Watkin Williams-Wynn, 4th Baronet and his great-great grandfather was British prime minister George Grenville. Wintour was the nephew of Liberal politician Charles Milnes Gaskell.

== Military career ==
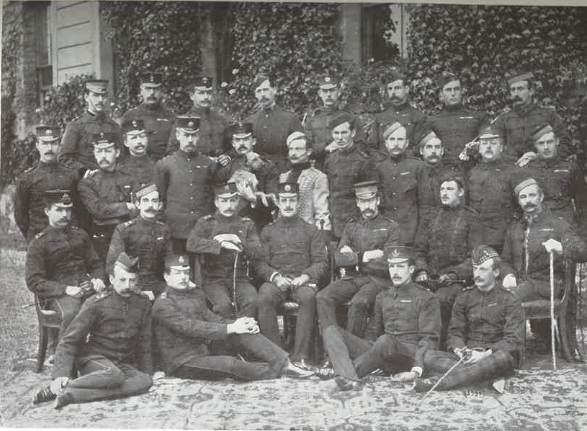
The Staff College, Camberley, class in 1890. Sat in the front row, third from the left, is Fitzgerald Wintour.

After passing out from the Royal Military College at Sandhurst, Wintour was commissioned in the Queen's Own Royal West Kent Regiment on 11 August 1880. He was adjutant of the 1st Battalion of the Royal West Kents from 1884 to 1889. In 1890, he entered the British Army Staff College.

In 1882, he fought in the Anglo-Egyptian War. From 1884 to 1886, Wintour served with the Royal West Kents during the Mahdist War, and was promoted to the rank of captain in 1887. In 1897, Wintour was sent to the North Western Frontier Province as part of the Tochi Expedition. In 1899, he went to South Africa to fight in the Second Boer War, and was promoted to the rank of major in 1900. He transferred to the Norfolk Regiment in 1903 and was promoted to lieutenant colonel in 1904, and a brevet colonel in October 1905. He was made a colonel in 1908 and on 26 June 1909 was made a GSO1.

Wintour was made a Companion of the Order of the Bath (CB) during the 1910 Birthday Honours. In October 1912 he succeeded Major General John Hanbury-Williams as brigadier general in charge of administration and was promoted to the temporary rank of brigadier general while employed in this role.

During World War I, Wintour commanded a brigade, the Administration Scottish Command, in France from 1914 to 1915. Wintour was given command of the 84th Infantry Brigade, part of the 28th Division, the very next day. He was relieved of his command on 23 February 1915 after the brigade lost a hundred yards of trench during a raid by the Imperial German Army. Major-General Edward Bulfin, general officer commanding (GOC) of the division, visited Wintour's headquarters and told him that he was incapable of commanding a brigade in the field, to be replaced by Brigadier General Louis Bols. Wintour, reverting to his rank of colonel, was then sent to Casualty Clearing Station No.3, where he was diagnosed with neurasthenia and sent home. Wintour was placed on half-pay from 6 April until 29 June and returned to the Western Front on 30 June 1915, serving as deputy assistant and quartermaster general of the Second Army, holding this post until 9 November. He was then again placed on half-pay in January 1916 but in January 1917 he received a temporary appointment as an assistant quartermaster general.

He was placed on retired pay and retired from the army in March 1918 with the honorary rank of major general. He was made a Commander of the Order of the British Empire in the 1919 New Year Honours.

Photocopies of memoirs from Wintour's time in service, including an account of the Tochi Valley expedition in 1897 and a complaint relating to conditions in the trenches on the Western Front of World War I from 1915, are housed in the Liddell Hart Centre for Military Archives at King's College London. The documents were donated by his family in 1990.

== Personal life ==
Wintour's first wife died in 1904. On 6 January 1912, he married a second time to Alice Jane Blanche Foster, sister of Sir Augustus Vere Foster, 4th Baronet, in Epping, Essex. His wife was the great-granddaughter of the novelist Lady Elizabeth Foster (later the Duchess of Devonshire) and the Irish politician John Thomas Foster and the great-great-granddaughter of Frederick Hervey, 4th Earl of Bristol, who served as the Anglican Bishop of Derry.

Wintour and Foster had two children, Cordelia Mary Wintour (later Baroness James of Rusholme) and Charles Vere Wintour CBE. He served as the witness at his son's wedding. He is the grandfather of Dame Anna Wintour and Patrick Wintour.

== Death ==
Wintour died in 1949. An obituary was published in the Rossallian newspaper, which was the school newspaper for the Rossall School in Lancashire.
