= Sunday Dispatch =

Former British newspaper

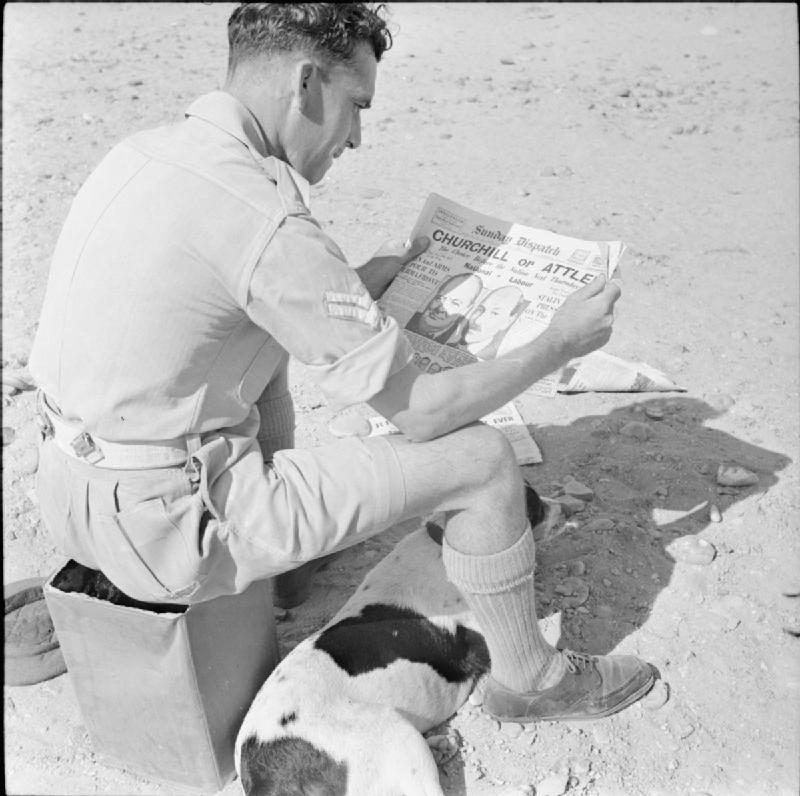
Corporal E. Hopwood of Acton, Wrexham, studies the Sunday Dispatch before voting in Egypt in the United Kingdom general election of 1945.

The Sunday Dispatch was a prominent British newspaper, published between 27 September 1801 and 18 June 1961. It was ultimately discontinued due to its merger with the Sunday Express.

== History ==
The newspaper was first published as the Weekly Dispatch in 1801, and was owned in the mid-1800s by notable solicitor James Harmer, who served as a model for Jaggers, the Charles Dickens character from Great Expectations. Circulation was 50,100 in 1837 but had slumped to 37,500 by 1850.

In 1903, the Newnes family sold the paper to Alfred and Harold Harmsworth. The new owners then turned it around from bankruptcy and into the biggest selling Sunday newspaper in Britain at the time.

The newspaper's name was changed to the Sunday Dispatch in 1928.

Due to editor Charles Eade's role as Press Liaison officer for Lord Mountbatten during World War II, distribution of the Dispatch was up from 800,000 to over 2 million copies per edition in 1947.

In 1959, Eade and the editor of the Daily Sketch were fired due to a comment from Randolph Churchill that Esmond Harmsworth, 2nd Viscount Rothermere, was "pornographer royal" for his ownership of both the Daily Sketch and Sunday Dispatch.

Under its last editor, Walter Hayes, the Dispatch still maintained pre-printed posters with the headline "CHURCHILL IS DEAD", in preparation of the death of Randolph Churchill's father Winston Churchill.

In December 1960, the paper had a respectable circulation of 1,500,000 copies. Despite this, the Sunday Dispatch was merged with the Sunday Express in 1961.

The Dispatch is prominently featured in Philip Norman's 1996 novel Everyone's Gone to the Moon. The novel is centred on the reporting of the British pop invasion of America in the 1960s.

== Famous stories and headlines ==
- September 1927 – In light of the trial verdict of the murder of PC Gutteridge of the Metropolitan Police, the headline read "Hanged by a microscope". An early case of ballistics science, it reflected the fact that microscopic examination of the Smith & Wesson gun cartridge cases had provided the crucial evidence to convict car thieves Frederick Browne and Pat Kennedy of the murder.
- 1933 – published Harry Price's book Leaves From a Psychist's Case-Book in a series of 10 articles
- 1945 – the first Miss Great Britain contest was held by Morecambe and Heysham Council in association with the Dispatch, which as a preliminary to the personal appearance heats at Morecambe, photographic heats held in the newspaper attracted contestant from all over the country. The first prize was seven guineas and a basket of fruit.
- 2 December 1945 – broke news that British spy John Amery was dying of tuberculosis. A post mortem revealed after his conviction and execution for high treason that he had not been suffering from the disease.
- 13 February 1949 – in light of the importation of American "dark humour" comics, the headline read: "Horror has crept into the British nursery. Morals of little girls in plaits and boys with marbles bulging in their pockets are being corrupted by a torrent of indecent coloured magazines that are flooding bookstalls and newsagents." The counter article was co-written by the Reverend Marcus Morris, later founder of The Eagle comic
- 1950 – in late summer, the Dispatch was partly responsible for launching the Flying Saucer debate in the UK, when in a circulation battle with the Sunday Express. Both papers competed to serialise the seminal books by Major Donald Keyhoe Flying Saucers are Real, Frank Scully’s Behind the Flying Saucers and Gerald Heard's Riddle of the Flying Saucers. Eade had been encouraged to promote "flying saucer" stories by his friend Lord Mountbatten whom he had served as Press officer during the Second World War. The Dispatch later reported on the 1951 Mount Kilimanjaro incident and the West Freugh Incident in April 1957
- June 1953 – serialisation of "The Rommel papers" edited by military historian Basil Liddell Hart.
- 25 April 1954 – the headline read "Doctor's Journal Launches a Startling Campaign – Smoking sensation – MP Urges Ban On Manufacture Of Cigarettes As Move Against Cancer Peril" on the risks of smoking and lung cancer. The article was later cited in 2000 by Gallaher Tobacco to the UK Parliamentary Health select committee showing that such risks had been known for some while
- 1954 – broke the story that racing driver Mike Hawthorn was not called up for National Service because he cited that he was not in the country, while actually he was
- 1959 – exposed a story about Scientology founder L. Ron Hubbard, where he sold shares at $65 each in a company that didn't exist. Hubbard apologised, and returned all monies, allegedly commenting: "It's lucky the police did not become involved, otherwise something most unpleasant might have happened."

== Former journalists and editors ==
- Gordon Beckles – became assistant editor at age 25 in 1927, journalist, editor and author
- Ursula Bloom – reporter. Later a novelist who wrote under numerous pseudonyms, she published over 500 books in her lifetime, an achievement that won her recognition in the Guinness Book of Records.
- William Brittain – editor from 1931 to 1934. He then bought the short-lived London Daily Recorder
- Collin Brooks – editor, 1930s.
- Randolph Churchill – political columnist. Resigned in 1936 following paper's refusal to publish one of his articles.
- Dorothy Crisp – a regular contributor of provocative articles. One edition in 1943 was banned in Ireland because it contained her criticisms of the de Valera's government.
- Charles Eade – editor, Press Liaison officer for Lord Mountbatten during the Second World War
- Alastair Forbes – wrote weekly column called "Behind the World Political Scene" from 1945, but he was fired in 1956.
- Charles Graves – journalist brother of Robert Graves
- Walter Hayes – editor, 1957–1961. Later Ford PR Vice President.
- Gerald McKnight – editor. Later founder of News Shopper
- Reverend Marcus Morris – first feature he ever wrote. Later founder of The Eagle comic
- Max Miller – the comedian wrote a weekly column.
- Bill Tidy – cartoonist
- Margaret Williams – reporter. Went to Berlin in 1946 with the first batch of British Army wives to rejoin their husbands serving in Germany.
- Ian Wooldridge – journalist

== Editors ==
1801: Robert Bell
1815: George Kent
1816: Robert Bell
1818: Williams

1838: James Harmer and Joseph Wrightson
1856: Sydney French
1862: Thomas James Serle
1875: Ashton Wentworth Dilke
1876: Henry Fox Bourne
1883: W. A. Hunter
1892: Frank Smith
1895: Charles John Tibbits
1903: Evelyn Wrench

1911: Montagu Cotton
1915: Hannen Swaffer
1919: Bernard Falk
1933: Harry Lane
1934: William Brittain
1936: Collin Brooks
1938: Charles Eade
1959: Bert Gunn
