= Patrick Wintour =

British journalist (born 1954)

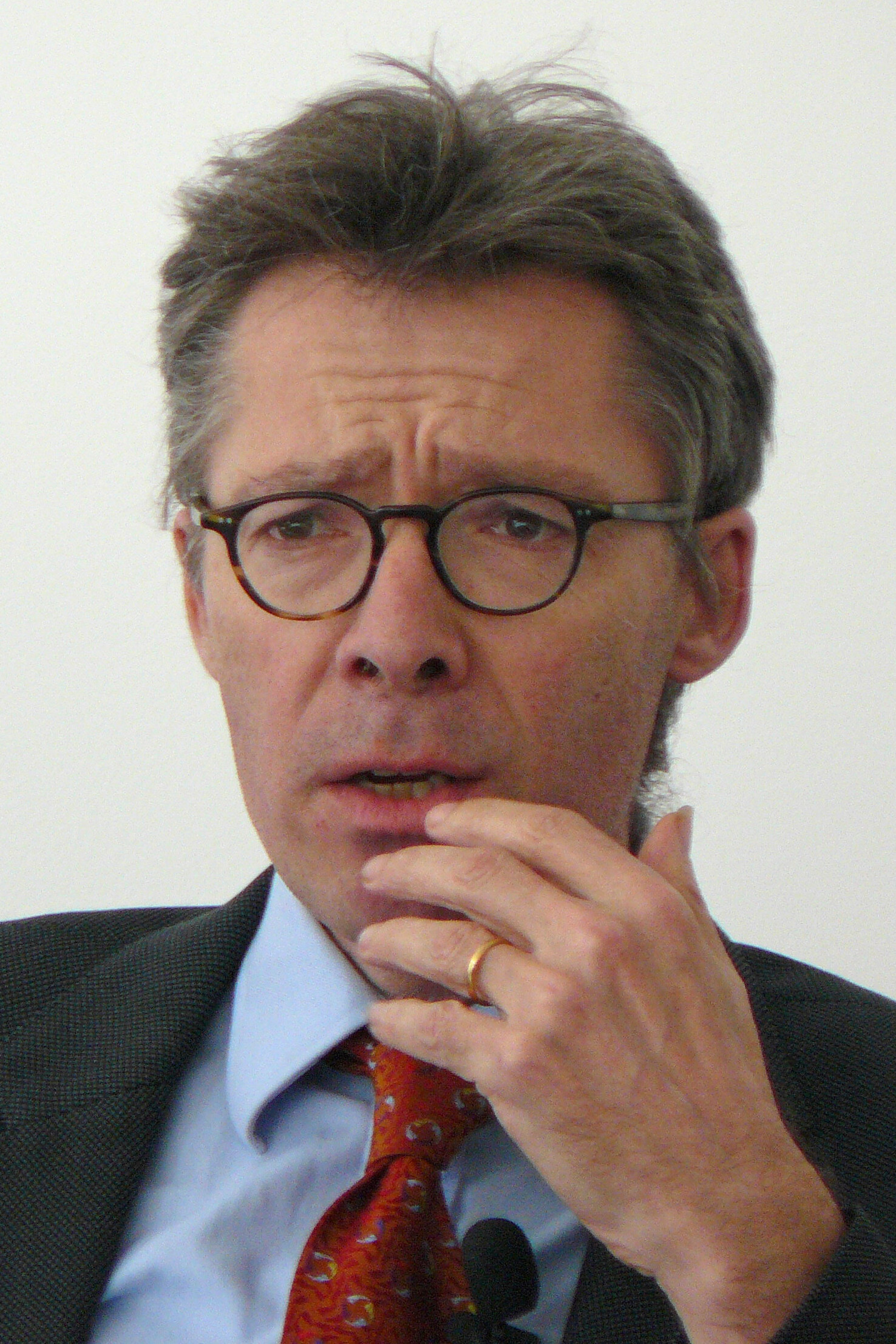
- Wintour speaking in 2012
- Born: 1 November 1954 (age 71)
- Education: Corpus Christi College, Oxford
- Occupation: Journalist
- Employer: The Guardian
- Spouses: Madeleine Bunting (divorced) Rachel Sylvester (m. 2002)
- Children: 4
- Parent(s): Charles Wintour; Eleanor Trego Baker
- Relatives: Dame Anna Wintour (sister)

Patrick Wintour (born 1 November 1954) is a British journalist and the diplomatic editor of The Guardian. He was the political editor of The Guardian from 2006 to 2015 and was formerly the newspaper's chief political correspondent for two periods, from 1988 to 1996, and 2000 to 2006. In the intervening period he was the political editor of The Observer.

== Early life ==
Wintour is the son of former Evening Standard editor Charles Vere Wintour by his marriage to Eleanor "Nonie" Trego Baker (1917–1995), an American, the daughter of a Harvard law professor. His parents married in 1940 and divorced in 1979. His elder sister, Dame Anna Wintour, was the editor-in-chief of the American edition of Vogue magazine from 1988 to 2025. His brother Jim arranged equestrian events at the 2012 Summer Olympics. Wintour is the grandson of Major-General Fitzgerald Wintour.

Wintour was educated at The Hall School in Hampstead, Westminster School and Corpus Christi College, Oxford. At Westminster, he was a contemporary of Adam Mars-Jones and Chris Huhne.

== Career ==
Wintour began his career in journalism on the New Statesman from 1976 to 1982, before joining The Guardian as chief Labour Correspondent in 1983. From 1988, he was the paper's Chief Political Correspondent, 1988–1996, and then Political Editor of The Observer, The Guardian's Sunday sister paper, until 2000. He returned to The Guardian as Chief Political Correspondent in 2000 before being appointed political editor in 2006, on the retirement of Michael White. Wintour won the British Press Awards "Political Journalist of the Year" award in 2007.

In October 2015, Wintour moved to a new role as The Guardian's Diplomatic Editor. In December Anushka Asthana and Heather Stewart were appointed to succeed him in a job-share arrangement. All three took up their new roles at the beginning of 2016.

== Personal life ==
Wintour's second wife is Rachel Sylvester, a journalist for The Times. The couple have two children.

Wintour was formerly married to the journalist Madeleine Bunting, with whom he also has two children.

Media offices
Preceded by Michael White	Political Editor of The Guardian; 2006–2015	Succeeded by Heather Stewart and Anushka Asthana
