= Victor Matthews, Baron Matthews =

British businessman

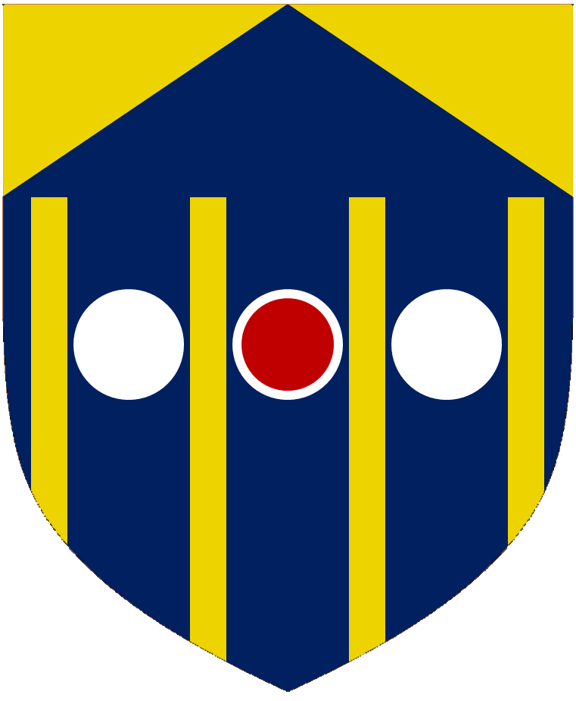
Arms of Victor Matthews, Baron Matthews

Victor Collin Matthews, Baron Matthews (5 December 1919 – 5 December 1995) was Group Managing Director of Trafalgar House, one of the United Kingdom's largest contracting businesses as well as the proprietor of the Daily Express.

== Career ==
Born in Islington and educated at Highbury School, Victor Matthews initially worked as an office boy for a tobacco business. During World War II he served as an able seaman in the Royal Navy Volunteer Reserve and saw action at Dunkirk.

After the War he joined Trollope & Colls, a large construction business, where he became a contracts manager. He then bought his own construction business, Bridge Walker, which he expanded significantly before selling it to Trafalgar House. He became Group Managing Director of Trafalgar House in 1968 and Deputy Chairman in 1973.

In 1977 Trafalgar House acquired Beaverbrook Newspapers and in 1982, it was floated on the London Stock Exchange as Fleet Holdings with Matthews as its chairman. Matthews renamed the business Express Newspapers after its lead publication, the Daily Express. He had confrontations with the trade unions but eventually secured their support.

In August 1980 Trafalgar House bought Firestone tyre factory, a unique example of Art Deco architecture, which was about to become a listed building. Matthews personally ordered destruction of the main features of the facade over the bank holiday weekend, two days before the building was to be listed.

He was created a Life Peer on 22 July 1980 taking the title Baron Matthews, of Southgate in the London Borough of Enfield.

In 1985 the business was acquired by United Newspapers and Matthews retired to Jersey. He died there in 1995.

== Family ==
In 1942 he married Joyce Geraldine Pilbeam; the couple had one son.

== Arms ==
Coat of arms of Victor Matthews, Baron Matthews

Crest
A Horse forcene Or against a Corinthian Column of White Marble proper
Escutcheon
Azure a Roundel Gules fimbriated Argent between two Roundels also Argent and all between four Pallets Or a Chief per chevron throughout also Or and Azure
Supporters
Dexter: a Horse reguardant Or gorged with a Wreath of two Ribands Tenné and Grey tied at the rear and the ends flying to the dexter; Sinister: a Stag reguardant Azure attired unguled and gorged with a Laurel Wreath Gold
Motto
Quisque Fortunae Suae Architectus
