= Daily Sketch =

British national tabloid newspaper (1909–1971)

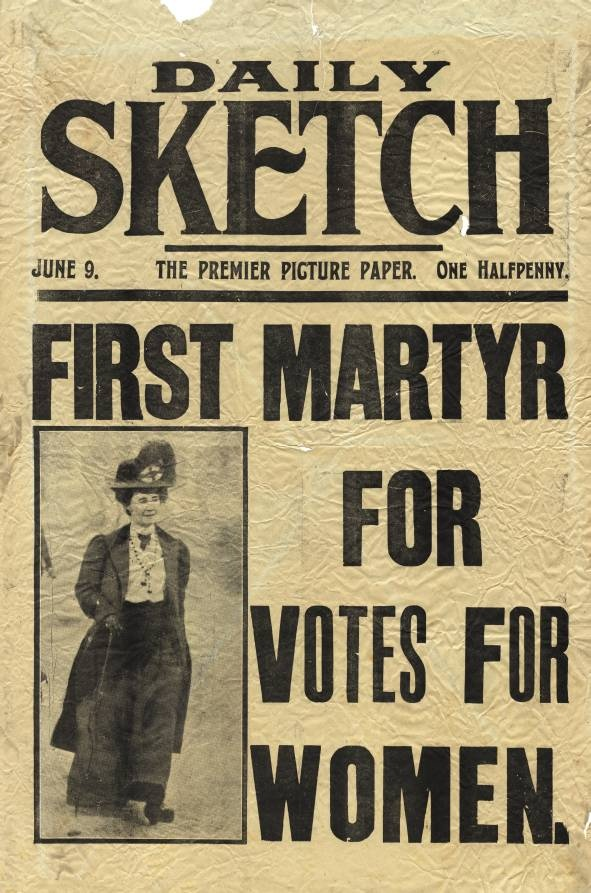
- Daily Sketch front page on 9 June 1913 mentioning the death of Emily Davison.
- Type: Newspaper
- Format: Tabloid
- Owner(s): Edward Hulton (1909–1920); Daily Mirror Newspapers (1920–1925); Allied Newspapers/Kemsley Newspapers (1925-1952); Associated Newspapers (1952–1971)
- Founder: Edward Hulton
- Founded: 1909; 117 years ago in Manchester
- Ceased publication: May 11, 1971; 55 years ago; merged into the Daily Mail
- Political alignment: Populist, centre-right, Conservative Party
- Sister newspapers: Sunday Graphic (1927–1952)

The Daily Sketch was the oldest national tabloid newspaper in the UK. It was founded in Manchester in 1909 by Sir Edward Hulton, 1st Baronet.

The Sketch was Conservative in its politics and populist in its tone during its existence through all its changes of ownership. Faced with declining circulation in the 1950s and 1960s and competition from the Daily Mirror, it closed on Tuesday, 11 May 1971, and merged with the Daily Mail.

== History ==
In its most prosperous times, the Sketch enjoyed a daily print run of 1.3 million.

In 1920, Lord Rothermere's Daily Mirror Newspapers bought the Daily Sketch. In 1925 Rothermere sold it to William and Gomer Berry (later Viscount Camrose and Viscount Kemsley). In 1926 it absorbed the Daily Graphic.

It was owned by a subsidiary of the Berrys' Allied Newspapers from 1928 (renamed Kemsley Newspapers in 1937 when Camrose withdrew to concentrate his efforts on The Daily Telegraph). From this point forward, its sister newspaper was the Sunday Graphic.

In 1946, twenty years after it had taken over the Daily Graphic, the latter name was revived and the Daily Sketch name disappeared for a while.

In 1952, Kemsley decided to sell the paper to Associated Newspapers, the owner of the Daily Mail, which promptly revived the Daily Sketch name in 1953.

In 1954, an infamous cartoon, titled "Family Portrait?", was published in the paper, which mocked Billy Strachan, a black British civil rights leader, for his anti-colonial and anti-imperialist beliefs. The cartoon depicted him with devil horns representing the Caribbean Labour Congress. His image was posed with images of Hewlett Johnson and Paul Robeson, all of whom stood underneath a portrait of the then recently deceased Soviet dictator Joseph Stalin.

The paper participated in the 1965 press campaign against the screening of the BBC film The War Game.

The paper struggled through the 1950s and 1960s, never managing to compete successfully with the Daily Mirror, and on Tuesday, 11 May 1971, it closed and merged with the Daily Mail, which had just switched to tabloid format.

== Editors ==
1909: Jimmy Heddle
1914: William Sugden Robinson
1919: H. Lane
1922: H. Gates
1923: H. Lane
1926: Ivor Halstead
1928: A. Curthoys
1936: A. Sinclair
1939: Sydney Carroll
1942: Lionel Berry
1943: A. Roland Thornton and M. Watts
1944: A. Roland Thornton
1947: N. Hamilton
1948: Henry Clapp
1953: Herbert Gunn
1959: Colin Valdar
1962: Howard French
1969: David English
1971: Louis Kirby (acting)
