= List of baronetcies in the Baronetage of the United Kingdom: B =

Peerages and baronetcies of Britain and Ireland
Extant	All
Dukes	Dukedoms
Marquesses	Marquessates
Earls	Earldoms
Viscounts	Viscountcies
Barons	Baronies
Baronets	Baronetcies
En, Ire, NS, GB, UK (extinct)

This is a list of baronetcies in the Baronetage of the United Kingdom. They have been created since 1801 when they replaced the baronetages in the Baronetage of Great Britain, and Baronetage of Ireland. This list is not currently complete.

Title	Date of creation	Surname	Current status	Notes
Backhouse of Uplands	1901	Backhouse	extant	
Baddeley of Lakefield	1922	Baddeley	extant	Lord Mayor of London
Baden-Powell of Bentley	1922	Baden-Powell	extant	first Baronet created Baron Baden-Powell in 1929
Bagge of Stradsett Hall	1867	Bagge	extant	
Bagot of Levens Hall	1913	Bagot	extinct 1920	
Bailey of Glanusk Park	1852	Bailey	extant	first Baronet created Baron Glanusk in 1889
Bailey of South Africa	1919	Bailey	extant	7
Baillie of Berkeley Square	1819	Baillie, Mackenzie	extinct 1853	first Baronet had already been created a Baronet in 1812, which title became extinct in 1820
Baillie of Polkemmet	1823	Baillie	extant	
Baillie of Portman Square	1812	Baillie	extinct 1820	first Baronet obtained a new patent in 1819, which creation became extinct in 1853
Baird of Newbyth	1809	Baird	extant	
Baird of Stonehaven (now Keith)	1897	Baird	extant	second Baronet created Viscount Stonehaven in 1938; the second Viscount succeeded as Earl of Kintore in 1974.
Baker of Ranston	1802	Baker	extinct 1959	
Balfour of Albury Lodge	1911	Balfour	extinct 1929	
Balfour of Sheffield	1929	Balfour	extant	first Baronet created Baron Riverdale in 1935; baronetcy unproven (2nd baronet died 1998) - under review
Ball of Blofield	1801	Ball	extinct 1874	
Ball of Merrion Square and Killybegs	1911	Ball	extant	
Banbury of Warneford Place	1903	Banbury	extant	first Baronet created Baron Banbury of Southam in 1924
Barber of Culham Court	1924	Barber	extinct 1927	
Barber of Greasley	1960	Barber	extant	
Barbour of Hilden	1943	Barbour	extinct 1951	
Baring of Nubia House	1911	Baring	extant	
Barker-Mill of Mottisfont	1836	Barker-Mill	extinct 1860	
Barker of Bishop's Stortford	1908	Barker	extinct 1914	
Barling of Edgbaston	1919	Barling	extinct 1940	
Barlow of Bradwall Hall	1907	Barlow	extant	
Barlow of Fort William	1803	Barlow	extant	
Barlow of London	1902	Barlow	extant	Physician to the King
Barlow of Westminster	1924	Barlow	extinct 1951	
Barnston of Churton	1924	Barnston	extinct 1929	
Baron of Holmbury House	1930	Baron	extinct 1934	
Barran of Sawley Hall	1895	Barran	extant	
Barrett-Lennard of Bell House	1801	Barrett-Lennard	extant	
Barrie of Adelphi Terrace	1913	Barrie	extinct 1937	
Barrington of Limerick	1831	Barrington	dormant	seventh Baronet died 2003
Barron of Glenanna	1841	Barron	extinct 1900	
Barrow of Ulverstone	1835	Barrow	extant	
Barry of Ockwells Manor	1899	Barry	extant	
Bartlett of Hardington	1913	Bartlett	dormant	unproven, baronetcy may exist, under investigation of crown (fourth Baronet died 1998)
Barton of Fethard	1918	Barton	extinct 1937	
Barttelot of Stopham	1875	Barttelot	extant	
Barwick of Ashbrooke Grange	1912	Barwick	extinct 1979	
Bass of Stafford	1882	Bass	extinct 1952	
Bateman of Hartington Hall	1806	Bateman	extant	second Baronet inherited the baronetcy of Scott of Great Barr in 1851; in 1905 the baronetcy was inherited by the fourth Fuller-Acland-Hood Baronet of St Audries.
Bates of Gwyn Castle	1880	Bates	extant	Unproven; sixth Baronet died 2007
Bates of Magherabuoy	1937	Bates	extant	
Bateson of Belvoir Park	1818	de Yarburgh-Bateson	extinct 2006	second Baronet created Baron Deramore in 1885
Batho of Frinton	1928	Batho	extant	Lord Mayor of London
Baxter of Invereighty	1918	Baxter	extinct 1926	
Baxter of Kilmaron	1863	Baxter	extinct 1872	
Bayley of Bedford Square	1834	Bayley, Laurie	extant	
Baynes of Harefield Place	1801	Baynes	extant	
Bayntun-Sandys of Missenden	1809	Bayntun-Sandys	extinct 1848	
Bazley of Tolmers	1869	Bazley	extant	
Beale of Drumlamford	1912	Beale	extinct 1922	
Beardmore of Flichity	1914	Beardmore	extinct 1936	first Baronet created Baron Invernairn in 1921
Beauchamp of Grosvenor Place	1911	Beauchamp	extinct 1976	
Beauchamp of Woodborough	1918	Beauchamp	extinct 1983	
Beckett of Kirkdale	1921	Beckett	extant	
Beckett of Leeds	1813	Beckett	extant	fifth Baronet created Baron Grimthorpe in 1886
Beecham of Mursley Hall	1914	Beecham	dormant	third Baronet died 1982
Beit of Tewin Water	1924	Beit	dormant	second Baronet died 1994
Bell of Framewood	1908	Bell	extinct 1924	Lord Mayor of London
Bell of Marlborough Terrace	1895	Bell	extinct 1943	Lord Provost of Glasgow
Bell of Mynthurst	1909	Bell	extinct 1955	
Bell of Rounton Grange	1885	Bell	extant	
Bellew of Mount Bellew	1838	Bellew, Grattan-Bellew	extant	
Benn of Bolton Gardens	1926	Benn	extinct 1937	first baronet created Baron Glenravel in 1936
Benn of Old Knoll	1914	Benn	extant	
Benn of Rollesby	1920	Benn	extinct 1992	
Bennett of Kirklington	1929	Bennett	extant	
Bensley of Marylebone	1801	Bensley	extinct 1809	
Benyon of Englefield	1958	Benyon	extinct 1959	
Beresford of Bagnall	1814	Beresford, Beresford-Pierse	extant	
Bernard of Snakemoor	1954	Bernard	extant	
Berry of Catton	1806	Berry	extinct 1831	
Berry of Dropmore	1928	Berry	extant	first Baronet created Viscount Kemsley in 1945
Berry of Hackwood Park	1921	Berry	extant	first Baronet created Viscount Camrose in 1941; baronetcy unproven as of 30 June 2006 (3rd baronet died 2001) - under review of the Registrar of the Baronetage
Bertie of the Navy	1812	Bertie	extinct 1824	
Bethell of Romford	1911	Bethell	extant	first Baronet created Baron Bethell in 1922
Bethune of Kilconquhar	1836	Bethune	extinct 1894	
Betterton of Blackfordby	1929	Betterton	extinct 1949	first Baronet created Baron Rushcliffe in 1935
Beynon of the Coldra	1920	Beynon	extinct 1944	
Bibby of Tarporley	1959	Bibby	extant	
Bilsland of Park Circus	1907	Bilsland	extinct 1970	Lord Provost of Glasgow; second Baronet created Baron Bilsland in 1950
Bingham of Sheffield	1903	Bingham	extinct 1945	
Birch of Hasles	1831	Birch	extinct 1880	
Birchenough of Macclesfield	1920	Birchenough	extinct 1937	
Bird of Edgbaston	1922	Bird	extant	
Birdwood of Anzac	1919	Birdwood	extinct 2015	first Baronet created Baron Birdwood in 1938
Birkbeck of Horstead Hall	1886	Birkbeck	extinct 1907	
Birkin of Ruddington Grange	1905	Birkin	extant	
Birkmyre of Dalmunzie	1921	Birkmyre	extant	
Black of Louth Park	1918	Black	extinct 1942	
Black of Midgham Park	1922	Black	extant	
Blackwood of the Navy	1814	Blackwood	extant	seventh Baronet succeeded as Baron Dufferin and Claneboye in 1988
Blades of Cobham	1922	Blades	extinct 1991	first Baronet created Baron Ebbisham in 1928
Blair of Harrow Weald	1945	Blair	extinct 1962	
Blake of Tillmouth	1907	Blake	extant	
Blaker of Brighton	1919	Blaker	extant	
Bland-Sutton of Hertford Street	1925	Bland-Sutton	extinct 1936	
Blane of Blanefield and Culverlands	1812	Blane	extinct 1916	
Blennerhassett of Blennerville	1809	Blennerhassett	extant	
Blomefield of Attleborough	1807	Blomefield	extant	
Blyth of Chelmsford	1895	Blyth	extant	first Baronet created Baron Blyth in 1907
Boileau of Tacolnestone Hall	1838	Boileau	extant	
Boles of Bishops Lydeard	1922	Boles	extant	
Bolton of West Plean	1927	Bolton	extinct 1982	
Bonham of Malmesbury	1852	Bonham	extant	
Bonsor of Kingswood	1925	Bonsor	extant	
Boord of Wakehurst	1896	Boord	extant	
Boot of Nottingham	1917	Boot	extinct 1956	first Baronet created Baron Trent in 1929
Booth of Allerton	1916	Booth	extant	
Booth of Portland Place	1835	Booth	extinct 1896	
Borough of Coolock Lodge	1813	Borough	extinct 1879	
Borthwick of Heath House	1887	Borthwick	extinct 1908	first Baronet created Baron Glenesk in 1895
Borthwick of Whitburgh	1908	Borthwick	extant	second Baronet created Baron Whitburgh in 1912, which title became extinct in 1967
Borwick of Hawkshead	1916	Borwick	extant	first Baronet created Baron Borwick in 1922
Bossom of Maidstone	1953	Bossom	extant	
Boswell of Auchinleck	1821	Boswell	extinct 1857	
Boehm, later Boehm-Boteler of Wetherby Gardens	1889	Boehm, Boehm-Boteler	extinct 1928	
Boulton of Braxted Park	1944	Boulton	extant	
Boulton of Copped Hall	1905	Boulton	dormant	fourth Baronet died 1996
Bourne of Hackinsall Hall and Heathfield	1880	Bourne	extinct 1883	
Bowater of Friston	1939	Bowater	extant	Lord Mayor of London
Bowater of Hill Crest	1914	Bowater	extant	Lord Mayor of London
Bowden of Nottingham	1915	Bowden	extant	
Bowen-Jones of St Mary's Court	1911	Bowen-Jones	extinct 1925	
Bowen of Colworth	1921	Bowen	extant	
Bower of Chislehurst	1925	Bower	extinct 1948	Lord Mayor of London
Bowlby of Manchester Square	1923	Bowlby	extant	
Bowles of Enfield	1926	Bowles	extinct 1943	
Bowman of Clifford Street and Joldwynds	1884	Bowman	extinct 2003	
Bowman of Killingworth	1961	Bowman	extinct 1990	
Bowring of Beechwood	1907	Bowring	extinct 1916	
Bowyer of Weston Underwood	1933	Bowyer	extant	first Baronet created Baron Denham in 1937
Boxall of Cambridge Square	1919	Boxall	extinct 1945	
Boyce of Badgeworth	1952	Boyce	extant	Lord Mayor of London
Boyd of Howth	1916	Boyd	extant	
Boyle of Ockham	1904	Boyle	extant	
Bradford of Mawddwy	1931	Bradford	extinct 1935	President of the Royal College of Physicians
Bradford of Minety	1902	Bradford	extant	
Brady of Hazelbrook	1869	Brady	extinct 1927	
Brain of Eynsham	1954	Brain	extant	President of the Royal College of Physicians; first Baronet created Baron Brain in 1962
Braithwaite of Burnham	1954	Braithwaite	extinct 1958	
Braithwate of Poston	1802	Braithwate	extinct 1809	
Bramwell of Hyde Park Gate	1889	Bramwell	extinct 1903	
Brassey of Apethorpe	1922	Brassey	extant	first Baronet created Baron Brassey of Apethorpe in 1938
Brentnall of Clifton	1963	Brentnall	extinct 1980	
Brenton of London	1812	Brenton	extinct 1862	
Brickwood of Portsmouth	1927	Brickwood	extinct 2006	
Briggs of Briggs Dayrell	1871	Briggs	extinct 1887	
Broadhead, later Brinckman of Monk Bretton	1831	Broadhead, Brinckman	extant	
Brisbane of Brisbane	1836	Brisbane	extinct 1860	
Briscoe of Bourne Hall	1910	Briscoe	extant	
Broadbent of Longwood and Brook Street	1893	Broadbent	dormant	fourth Baronet died 1992
Broadbridge of Brighton	1937	Broadbridge	extant	Lord Mayor of London; first Baronet created Baron Broadbridge in 1945
Broadhurst of North Rode	1918	Broadhurst	extinct 1922	
Brocklebank of Greenlands	1885	Brocklebank	extant	
Brocklehurst of Swythamley Park and Stanhope Terrace	1903	Brocklehurst	extinct 1981	
Brodie of Boxford and Savile Row	1834	Brode	dormant	fourth Baronet died 1971
Brodie of Idvies	1892	Brodie	extinct 1896	
Broke of Broke Hall	1813	Broke, Broke-Middleton	extinct 1887	
Bromhead of Thurlby	1806	Bromhead	extant	
Brooke of Colebrooke	1822	Brooke	extant	fifth Baronet created Viscount Brookeborough in 1952
Brooke of Almondbury	1919	Brooke	extant	
Brooke of Armitage Bridge	1899	Brooke	extinct 1908	
Brooke of Summerton	1903	Brooke	extant	
Brooks of Crawshaw Hall and Whatton House	1891	Brooks	extant	first Baronet created Baron Crawshaw in 1892
Brooks of Manchester	1886	Brooks	extinct 1900	
Brooksbank of Healaugh	1919	Brooksbank	extant	
Brotherton of Wakefield	1918	Brotherton	extinct 1930	first Baronet created Baron Brotherton in 1929
Brown of Astrop	1863	Brown	extant	
Brown of Broome Hall	1903	Brown, Piggott-Brown	extinct 2020	
Brownrigg of London	1816	Brownrigg	extant	
Bruce-Gardner of Frilford	1945	Bruce-Gardner	extant	
Bruce of Dublin	1812	Bruce	extinct 1841	
Bruce of Stonehill	1804	Bruce	extant	
Brunner of Druids Cross, Winnington Old Hall and Ennismore Gardens	1895	Brunner	dormant	third Baronet died 1982
Brunton of Stratford Place	1908	Brunton	extant	
Brydges, later Egerton-Barrett-Brydges of Denton Court	1815	Brydges, Egerton-Barrett-Brydges	extinct 1863	
Buchan-Hepburn of Smeaton	1815	Buchan-Hepburn	extant	
Buchanan of Dunburgh	1878	Buchanan	extant	
Buchanan of Lavington	1920	Buchanan	extinct 1935	first Baronet created Baron Woolavington in 1922
Buckley of Mawddwy	1868	Buckley	extinct 1919	
Bull of Hammersmith	1922	Bull	extant	
Buller of Tranant Park	1808	Buller	extinct 1824	
Bullock of Crosby	1954	Bullock	extinct 1966	
Bullough of Kinlock Castle	1916	Bullough	extinct 1939	
Burbidge of Littleton	1916	Burbidge	extant	
Burdon-Sanderson of Banbury Road	1899	Burdon-Sanderson	extinct 1905	
Burgoyne of the Army	1856	Burgoyne	extinct 1871	
Burne-Jones of Rottingdean and the Grange	1894	Burne-Jones	extinct 1926	
Burnett of Selborne House	1913	Burnett	extant	Lord Mayor of London
Burney of Preston Candover	1921	Burney	extant	
Burns of Wemyss Bay	1889	Burns	extinct 1957	first Baronet created Baron Inverclyde in 1897
Burrard of Lymington	1807	Burrard	extinct 1870	
Burroughs of Castle Bagshaw	1804	Burroughs	extinct 1829	
Burrows of London	1874	Burrows	extinct 1917	President of the Royal College of Physicians
Burton-Chadwick of Bidston	1935	Burton-Chadwick	extant	
Butcher of Danesfort	1918	Butcher	extinct 1935	first Baronet created Baron Danesfort in 1924
Butcher of Holland	1960	Butcher	extinct 1960	
Butler of Edgbaston	1926	Butler	extinct 1939	
Butler of Old Park	1922	Butler	extant	
Butlin of London	1911	Butlin	extinct 1916	
Butt of Westminster	1929	Butt	extinct 1999	
Buxton of Belfield	1840	Buxton	extant	
Buzzard of Munstead Grange	1929	Buzzard	extant	
Byass of Port Talbot	1926	Byass	extinct 1976	
