= James Brunton (disambiguation) =

James Brunton is a Canadian judge.

James Brunton may also refer to:

- Sir James Lauder Brunton, 4th Baronet (born 1947), of the Brunton baronets
- Sir (James) Stopford Lauder Brunton, 2nd Baronet (1884–1943), of the Brunton baronets

== See also ==
- Brunton (disambiguation)
