= Brunton (surname) =

Brunton is a surname. Notable people with the surname include:

- Alan Brunton (1946–2002), New Zealand poet
- Alexander Brunton (1772–1854), Scottish minister in the Church of Scotland
- Anna Ross Brunton (1773-?), English actress and dramatist
- Barbara Brunton (1927–2014), Australian stage and radio actress
- C. Brunton (Norfolk cricketer) (fl. 1820)
- Colin Brunton (born 1955), Canadian film director
- Dianne Brunton, New Zealand ecologist
- Dorothy Brunton (1890–1977), Australian singer and actress
- Elizabeth Brunton (1799–1860), English actress
- Elizabeth York Brunton (1880–c. 1960), Scottish artist
- Gordon Brunton (1921–2017), English businessman
- Guy Brunton (1878–1948), English archaeologist and Egyptologist
- Kira Brunton (born 1999), Canadian curler
- James Brunton, contemporary Canadian judge
- John Brunton (cricketer) (1869–1962), English cricketer
- John Brunton (manufacturer) (1837–1917), Scottish businessman
- John Brunton (scenic artist) (1849–1909), in Britain and Australia
- Joseph Brunton (1902–1988), American Boy Scout leader
- Lauder Brunton (1844–1916), Scottish physician and first of the Brunton baronets
- Louis Brunton (1891–1934), New Zealand cricketer
- Louisa Brunton (1785?–1860), English actress
- Mary Brunton (1778–1818), Scottish novelist
- Matt Brunton (1878–1962), English soccer player
- Neil Brunton (born 1969), Australian rules footballer
- Paul Brunton (1898–1981), British philosopher and mystic
- Paul Brunton (politician) (born 1944), American politician
- Renita Brunton, suspected murder victim of Peter Dupas
- Richard Henry Brunton (1841–1901), Scottish lighthouse builder active in Japan
- Richard Brunton (artist) (c. 1749 – 1832), British-American artist and counterfeiter
- Robbie Brunton (1973–2020), Irish soccer player
- Ron Brunton (born 1945), Australian anthropologist
- Samuel Brunton (born 1990), Cook Islands rugby league player
- Violet Brunton (1878–1951), English artist
- William Brunton (1777–1851), Scottish engineer and inventor
- William Brunton (mayor) (1867–1938), of Melbourne, Australia
- Winifred Brunton (1880–1959), South African painter

== See also ==
- Brunton baronets
