= Hackwood Park =

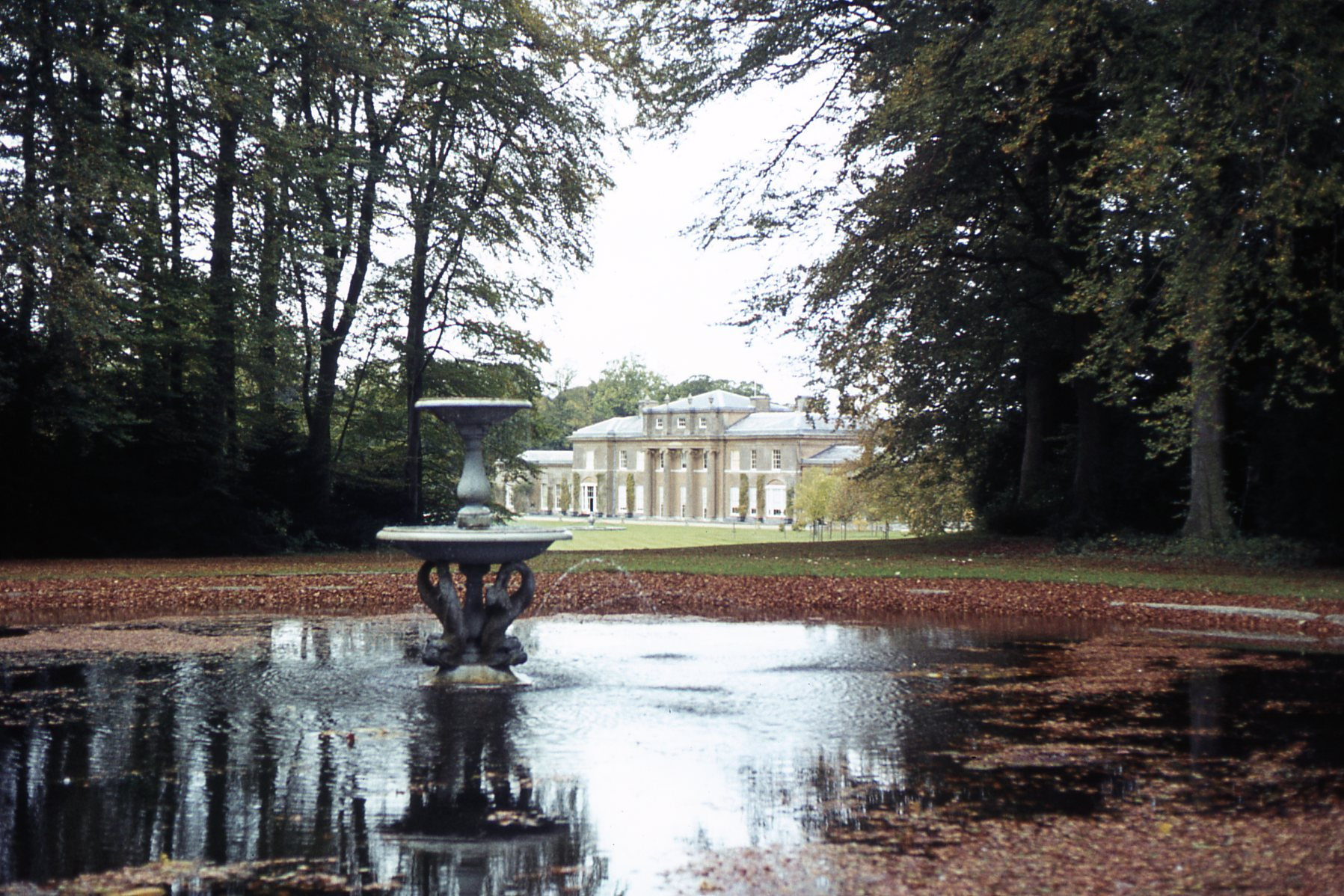
- Hackwood Park in 1984
- Interactive map of the Hackwood Park area

General information
- Type: Manor
- Location: Basingstoke, Hampshire, United Kingdom
- Coordinates: 51.242311°N 1.074211°W
- Construction started: 1683
- Completed: 1687

Hackwood Park is a 260-acre (110 ha) country estate that primarily consists of an 18th-century ornamental woodland and formal lawn garden and a 51,681 sq ft (4,801.3 m^{2}), long mansion, in light stone, of symmetrical design. It remains a large part of Winslade, a small parish immediately southeast of Basingstoke in Hampshire, which had a population of 174 people throughout the 1801 to 1851 period when the manorial interest still held legal value. The parks and gardens are Grade I listed on the Register of Historic Parks and Gardens and the main house is Grade II* listed on the National Heritage List for England. It was placed on the market in 2016 seeking offers of around £65 million. As of 2025, it remains for sale but now nominally as two expert restoration companies seeking a grant of planning permission for use as a hotel (sought in March 2025), instructed via the owners. These restored The Connaught (hotel), and Claridge's, in Mayfair, London

== History ==
The estate was owned by the manor or the rectory of Eastrop (itself a daughter parish of Basing) until 1223, when it became a noble's deer park in its own right. William Paulet, 1st Marquess of Winchester bought the estate to shore up Basing House in the 16th-century, the manorial rights and patronage of the church. The bulk of today's house was built from 1683 to 1687 for a son of the fifth Marquess, to replace Basing House that burnt down by Charles Paulet, created Duke of Bolton. The estate was inherited by his son, the second Duke in 1699, followed by his grandson, the third Duke in 1772. The property, in fine art, was painted by Paul Sandby in 1764.

After the death of Harry Powlett, 6th Duke of Bolton in 1794, the house descended to the successive Barons Bolton.

Lord Curzon was a tenant from 1906 until his death in 1925. The estate was sold in 1936 to William Berry, 1st Viscount Camrose. During World War II it served as a psychiatric hospital for the Canadian Army. When Lord Camrose died in 1954 the property was inherited by his son, Seymour Berry, 2nd Viscount Camrose, who remained its owner until his death in 1995. His wife, Lady Camrose, the mother of Aga Khan IV, lived there until her death in 1997. An extension to the orangery has added a 21st-century spa complex complete with pool, sauna, laconicum, and treatment room.

== Description ==
The middle of the main façade of the house has a projection of four deep cornice-topped neo-classical columns with pilasters that appear floating above ground level as unsupported below. The central doorway is housed in an oval recess with two modest columns and pilasters – over at the side. The interior contains panelling and a large 17th-century fireplace, with a carved ornamental festoon brought from Abbotstone House in Wiltshire. The house was designed by Charles Bridgeman, with additional buildings designed by James Gibbs.

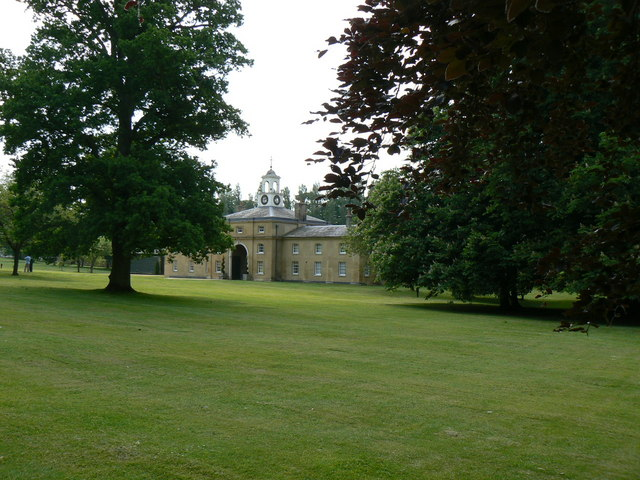
Stable block within the grounds of the property, used as an estate office

Other listed buildings include the fishing temple, a once-domed building with eight columns and an incomplete circular stone base, a 19th-century teahouse pavilion, a single story 18th-century orangery, a statue of George I which dates from 1722, and a 19th-century mill house. Grade II* listed buildings include an early 19th-century stable block and riding school, and a menagerie pond pavilion, which dates from 1727 and was given as a gift by James Gibbs to the third Duke of Bolton.

== See also ==
- Winslade
- Berry baronets
