= Charles Batho =

Lord Mayor of London

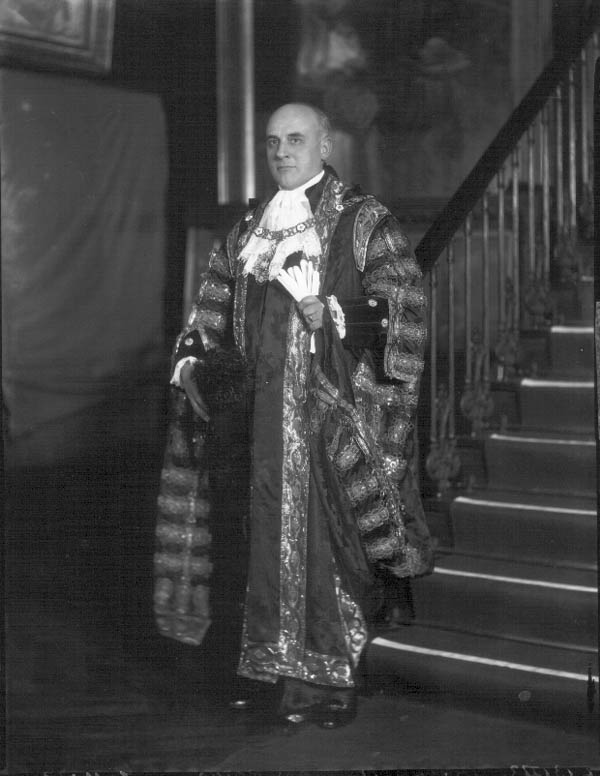
Sir Charles Albert Batho. Photographed 9 November 1927 in the Mansion House, London, for the Lord Mayor's Show.

Sir Charles Albert Batho, 1st Baronet (7 October 1872 – 29 January 1938) was Lord Mayor of London from 1927 to 1928.

Batho was educated at Highgate School. He worked for the ship store and export merchants, Copland and Co. He was elected to the Common Council of the City of London in 1913. He became the Alderman of the Ward of Aldgate in 1921.

Coat of arms of Charles Batho
Crest A dragon sejant Or gorged with a mural crown Gules and holding in the dexter claw a sword as in the arms. Escutcheon Gules on a fess Argent two castles of the first over all a sword in pale point upwards Proper. Motto Nec Parvis Sisto

== Notes ==
Civic offices
Preceded by Sir Rowland Blades, Bt	Lord Mayor of London; 1927–1928	Succeeded by Kynaston Studd
Baronetage of the United Kingdom
New creation	Baronet (of Frinton); 1928–1938	Succeeded by Maurice Batho
