= Lady Pamela Smith =

English socialite (1914–1982)

The Right Honourable The Lady Hartwell
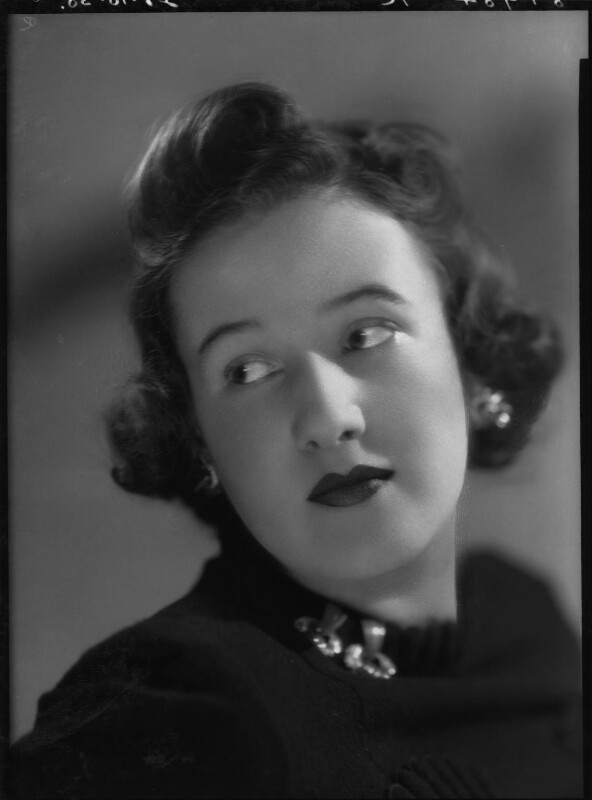
- Pamela Margaret Elizabeth Berry (née Smith), Lady Hartwell, by Bassano Ltd, 1938
- Born: Lady Pamela Margaret Elizabeth Smith; 16 May 1914; London, England
- Died: 7 January 1982 (aged 67); London, England
- Other names: Pamela Berry, Baroness Hartwell
- Known for: One of the Bright Young Things
- Spouse: Michael Berry, Baron Hartwell (m. 1936)
- Children: 4, including Adrian Berry, 4th Viscount Camrose
- Parent(s): F. E. Smith, 1st Earl of Birkenhead; Margaret Eleanor Furneaux

Pamela Margaret Elizabeth Berry, Baroness Hartwell (née Smith; 16 May 1914 – 7 January 1982), was an English socialite, known for her political salon. She was part of the Bright Young Things crowd, and Cecil Beaton wrote an entry about her in his The Book of Beauty. She became one of Britain's museum leaders.

== Early life ==
Born in London, the youngest child of F. E. Smith, 1st Earl of Birkenhead, and Margaret Eleanor Furneaux, daughter of academic Henry Furneaux, she was called Lady Pamela. When she was still in her teens, Cecil Beaton wrote of her and her sister Eleanor in The Book of Beauty, "Pamela is like the little Robinetta of Sir Joshua Reynolds with the thrush on her raised shoulder."

== Family life ==
In 1936, she married Michael Berry who held positions at London newspapers, as editor-in-chief and chairman of The Sunday Telegraph and The Daily Telegraph. He was briefly the 3rd Viscount Camrose before disclaiming the title. The couple had four children: Adrian Berry, 4th Viscount Camrose (1937–2016), Hon. Nicholas William Berry (1942–2016), Hon. Harriet Mary Margaret Berry (b. 1944), and Hon. Eleanor Agnes Berry (b. 1950).

== Works ==
Lady Pamela's interest in American politics led her to observing presidential candidates, travelling along with them on planes and buses after the 1950s. In the 1970s, she sat on the Victoria and Albert Museum's advisory council (1973 to 1978) and was chairman of the British Museum Society for four years before becoming a trustee of the museum in 1979. She also presided over the Incorporated Society of London Fashion Designers and was active in the British section of the Franco-British Council, working to promote British fashions internationally. She died on 7 January 1982.
