= Richard Berry, 3rd Viscount Kemsley =

British viscount (born 1951)

The Right Honourable The Viscount Kemsley

Member of the House of Lords
- Lord Temporal
- In office 28 February 1999 – 11 November 1999 as a hereditary peer
- Preceded by: The 2nd Viscount Kemsley
- Succeeded by: Seat abolished (Note: Pursuant to the House of Lords Act 1999.)

Personal details
- Born: Richard Gomer Berry; 17 April 1951 (age 75)

Richard Gomer Berry, 3rd Viscount Kemsley (born 17 April 1951), is a British hereditary peer who was briefly a member of the House of Lords.

== Background ==
Berry was born on 17 April 1951, the only son of Major Hon. Denis Gomer Berry and his second wife, Pamela Wellesley. Berry's paternal grandfather was Gomer Berry, 1st Viscount Kemsley. His maternal grandfather was Captain Lord Richard Wellesley, second son of Arthur Wellesley, 4th Duke of Wellington.

Berry was educated at Eton College. He succeeded to the viscountcy and to the subsidiary barony and baronetcy on 28 February 1999 on the death of his uncle, Lionel Berry, 2nd Viscount Kemsley.

== Private life ==
Berry married firstly Tana-Marie Lester, daughter of Clive William Lester, in 1981. There were no children of this marriage. They were divorced in 1988.

He married secondly Elizabeth Jane Barker, daughter of Dennis Norman Barker, on 17 September 1994. They have two children:

- Hon. Luke Gomer Berry (born 2 February 1998), heir apparent to the viscountcy and other titles.
- Hon. Jake Edward Berry (born 26 July 1999)

== Notes ==
Peerage of the United Kingdom
Preceded by Lionel Berry	Viscount Kemsley; 1999–present Member of the House of Lords (1999–1999)	Incumbent; Heir apparent: Hon. Luke Berry
Preceded by Lionel Berry	Baron Kemsley; 1999–present	Incumbent; Heir apparent: Hon. Luke Berry
Baronetage of the United Kingdom
Preceded by Lionel Berry	Berry baronets of Dropmore; 1999–present	Incumbent; Heir apparent: Hon. Luke Berry
