= Richard Brunton =

Richard Brunton may refer to:

- Richard Henry Brunton (1841–1901), the "Father of Japanese lighthouses"
- Richard Brunton (artist) (c. 1749–1832), British-American artist
- Richard Brunton, a character in The Adventure of the Musgrave Ritual, a Sherlock Holmes story by Sir Arthur Conan Doyle
