= Jonathan Berry, 5th Viscount Camrose =

British peer

The Right Honourable The Viscount Camrose
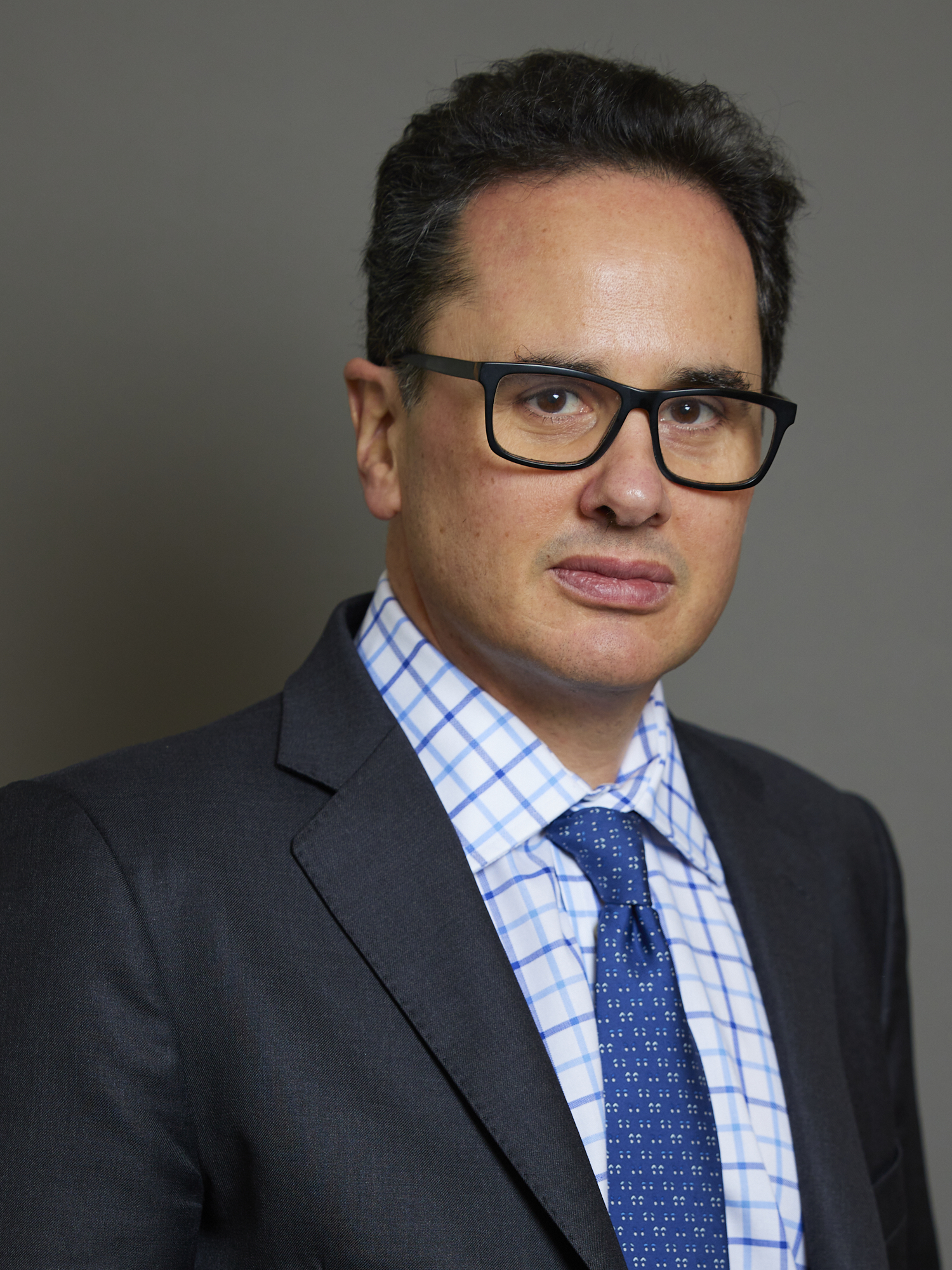
- Official portrait, 2022

Shadow Minister for Science, Innovation and Technology
- In office 1 September 2024 – 22 July 2026
- Leader: Rishi Sunak; Kemi Badenoch

Parliamentary Under-Secretary of State for Artificial Intelligence and Intellectual Property
- In office 7 March 2023 – 5 July 2024
- Prime Minister: Rishi Sunak
- Preceded by: Office established
- Succeeded by: Feryal Clark

Member of the House of Lords Lord Temporal
- Incumbent
- Life peerage 12 June 2026
- Elected Hereditary Peer; 6 April 2022 – 29 April 2026
- By-election: 2022
- Preceded by: The 3rd Baron Rotherwick
- Succeeded by: Seat abolished

Personal details
- Born: Jonathan William Berry; February 26, 1970 (age 56)
- Party: Conservative
- Spouse: Aurélie Molin (m. 1996)
- Children: 4
- Parent(s): Adrian Berry, 4th Viscount Camrose; Marina Beatrice Sulzberger

Jonathan William Berry, 5th Viscount Camrose, Baron Berry (born 26 February 1970) is a British hereditary peer and Conservative politician.

In May 2026, it was announced he was to be given one of 26 new life peerages, returning him to the House of Lords after the coming into force of the House of Lords (Hereditary Peers) Act 2026.

== Early life and education ==
Camrose was born in 1970, the only son of Adrian Berry, 4th Viscount Camrose and his wife Marina Beatrice Sulzberger. He is a great-grandson of the newspaper publisher William Berry, 1st Viscount Camrose and of the politician F. E. Smith, 1st Earl of Birkenhead.

He attended Durham University, completing a Bachelor of Arts in French and German in 1993, and a Master of Business Administration at Carnegie Mellon University. From 2008 to 2009, he was head of change management at BP and in 2010 he founded Camrose Communications Ltd.

Camrose succeeded to the viscountcy upon the death of his father in 2016.

== Parliamentary career ==
In a March 2022 by-election, Camrose was elected to replace Lord Rotherwick in the House of Lords following Rotherwick's retirement in February 2022. He made his maiden speech on 27 June 2022.

In March 2023, Rishi Sunak appointed Camrose a Parliamentary Under-Secretary of State at the Department for Science, Innovation and Technology where he was Minister for AI and Intellectual Property. Viscount Camrose became the second hereditary peer to be appointed to a ministerial role by Sunak.

Following the 2024 General Election Camrose was replaced as Minister for AI and Intellectual Property by Feryal Clark. He became Shadow Minister for Science under Sunak, and was reappointed by Kemi Badenoch.

Camrose ceased to be a member of the House of Lords following the passing of the House of Lords (Hereditary Peers) Act 2026, which excluded Hereditary Peers from the House. He returned to the House of Lords through a life peerage on June 2026, being created Baron Berry, of Aldsworth in the County of Gloucestershire.

== Marriage and children ==
Camrose married Aurélie Molin in 1996. They have four children:

- Hon Olivia Grace Berry (born 14 May 1998)
- Hon Hugo William Berry (born 2000), heir apparent to the viscountcy.
- Hon Charlotte Julia Berry (born 2001)
- Hon Tobias Furneaux Berry (born 2003), named after the British navigator Tobias Furneaux.

Peerage of the United Kingdom
Preceded by Adrian Berry	Viscount Camrose; 2016–present	Incumbent; Heir apparent: Hon. Hugo William Berry
Parliament of the United Kingdom
Preceded by The Lord Rotherwick	Elected hereditary peer to the House of Lords under the House of Lords Act 1999; 2022–2026	Position abolished under the House of Lords (Hereditary Peers) Act 2026
