= Michael Berry, Baron Hartwell =

British newspaper proprietor and journalist (1911–2001)

The Right Honourable The Lord Hartwell MBE

Member of the House of Lords
- Lord Temporal
- Hereditary peerage 15 February 1995 – 14 March 1995 (disclaimed)
- Preceded by: The 2nd Viscount Camrose
- Succeeded by: Seat abolished
- Life peerage 19 January 1968 – 3 April 2001

Personal details
- Born: 18 May 1911
- Died: 3 April 2001 (aged 89)
- Spouse: Lady Pamela Smith (m. 1936; died 1982)
- Children: 4, including Adrian Berry, 4th Viscount Camrose
- Parent: William Berry, 1st Viscount Camrose (father)
- Education: Eton College; Christ Church, Oxford

William Michael Berry, Baron Hartwell MBE (18 May 1911 – 3 April 2001), was a British newspaper proprietor and journalist.

== Early life and education ==
Berry was the second son of the 1st Viscount Camrose and his wife, Mary Agnes Corns. He was educated at Eton and Christ Church, Oxford.

== Career ==
Berry's father William Berry, 1st Viscount Camrose and uncle Gomer Berry, 1st Viscount Kemsley owned a string of newspapers through Allied Newspapers, which was dissolved in 1945 with Camrose taking the Daily Telegraph amongst others. Michael Berry edited the Glasgow Sunday Mail from 1934 to 1935, and was managing editor of the Financial Times from 1937 to 1939.

When Camrose died, Berry's older brother Seymour Berry, 2nd Viscount Camrose had taken to drink, and Michael unexpectedly became editor-in-chief of The Daily Telegraph. In 1961 Berry established the Sunday Telegraph, which was not initially a financial success.

Berry did not focus on the financial side of the newspaper, and in spring 1985 the company needed to raise money. Berry sold 14% of the shares to Conrad Black, with an option to purchase more if the company needed to raise more money. It did, and Black took control in December 1985. Berry retired in September 1986.

Berry was the initial backer behind the arts review X magazine.

Berry was awarded a life peerage as Baron Hartwell, of Peterborough Court in the City of London, on 19 January 1968. He succeeded his elder brother as the 3rd Viscount Camrose in February 1995, but disclaimed the title.

== Marriage and family ==
Lord Hartwell married Lady Pamela Smith, daughter of F. E. Smith, 1st Earl of Birkenhead. They had four children together:

- Adrian Michael Berry, 4th Viscount Camrose (15 June 1937 – 18 April 2016)
- Hon Nicholas William Berry (3 July 1942 – 25 December 2016)
- Hon. Harriet Mary Margaret Berry (born 8 November 1944)
- Hon. Eleanor Agnes Berry (born 6 May 1950)

== Death ==
Lord Hartwell died in Westminster, London, on 3 April 2001 at the age of 89. He was succeeded in the viscountcy, the Camrose barony and baronetcy by his elder son, Adrian. The Hartwell barony became extinct.

Coat of arms of Michael Berry, Baron Hartwell

Crest
A griffin sejant reguardant Sable collared Or.
Escutcheon
Argent three bars Gules over all a pile Ermine.
Supporters
Dexter a stag, sinister a wolf, Proper both collared Or and standing on a compartment with a well between paving to the dexter and grass to the sinister Proper.

Peerage of the United Kingdom
Preceded by Seymour Berry	Viscount Camrose; 1995	Disclaimed Title next held by Adrian Berry
