= Card, Cross and Jones: Criminal Law =

Book by Sir Rupert Cross and Philip Asterley Jones

- Editor: Richard Card
- Author: Sir Rupert Cross; Philip Asterley Jones
- Language: English
- Genre: Law
- Publisher: Butterworths, Oxford University Press
- Publication date: January 1948
- Publication place: United Kingdom

Card, Cross and Jones: Criminal Law, formerly published as An Introduction to Criminal Law and as Cross and Jones' Introduction to Criminal Law, and referred to as Cross and Jones, is a book about the criminal law of England and Wales, originally written by Sir Rupert Cross and Philip Asterley Jones, and then edited by them and Richard Card and Jill Molloy. It was published by Butterworths and is now published by Oxford University Press.

This book was so popular that the second edition was published within a year of the first. It has been described as "a serious contribution to the study of the criminal law" and as an "old and trusted friend".

The First Edition was published in January 1948, the Second in January 1949, the Third in July 1953, the Fourth in April 1959, the Fifth in June 1964, the Sixth in October 1968, the Seventh in July 1972, the Eighth in May 1976, the Ninth in July 1980, the Tenth in May 1984, the Eleventh in April 1988, the Twelfth in April 1992, the Thirteenth in April 1995, the Fourteenth in June 1998, the Fifteenth in July 2001, the Sixteenth in 2004, the Seventeenth in 2006, the Eighteenth in 2008, the Nineteenth in 2010, the Twentieth in 2012, the Twenty-first in 2014, and the Twenty-second in 2016.

A supplement to the Fifth Edition was published in 1967.

There was a companion volume by Cross and Jones called Cases on Criminal Law. The First Edition was published in 1949, the Second in 1953, the Third in 1962, the Fourth in 1968, and the Fifth in 1973. The Sixth Edition was published under the title Cases and Statutes on Criminal Law in 1977.

== See also ==
- Bibliography of English criminal law
