= Cheyne baronets =

Baronetcy in the Baronetage of the United Kingdom

Arms of Cheyne Baronets of Leagarth

Sir Watson Cheyne, 1st Baronet

The Cheyne baronetcy, of Leagarth in the parish of Fetlar and North Yell in the County of Zetland, is a title in the Baronetage of the United Kingdom. It was created on 20 July 1908 for the surgeon and bacteriologist Sir Watson Cheyne.

As of 2026 the title is held by his great-grandson, the fourth Baronet, who succeeded his father in 2007.

== Cheyne baronets, of Leagarth (1908) ==
- Sir (William) Watson Cheyne, 1st Baronet (1852–1932)
- Sir Joseph Lister Cheyne, 2nd Baronet (1888–1957) also known as R. Monroe.
- Sir Joseph Lister Watson Cheyne, 3rd Baronet (1914–2007)
- Sir Patrick John Lister Cheyne, 4th Baronet (born 1941)

The heir apparent is the present holder's son Louis Richard Patrick Lister Cheyne (born 1971).

== Extended family ==
William Watson Cheyne (1920–1970), second son of the second Baronet, was a brigadier in the Queen's Own Highlanders, who married Laurel Audrey Hutchison, daughter of Lt Gen Sir Balfour Hutchison.

Baronetage of the United Kingdom
Preceded by Brunton baronets	Cheyne baronets of Leagarth; 20 July 1908	Succeeded by Borthwick baronets
