= Solicitors Journal =

British legal periodical

- Categories: Legal periodical
- First issue: 1856; 169 years ago
- Website: www.solicitorsjournal.com
- ISSN: 0038-1047

Solicitors Journal is a legal periodical published in the United Kingdom.

It was established in 1856. It was published weekly until September 2017, when it ceased publication, and has been published monthly since January 2019, when it resumed publication.

It is a general law journal. It was a newspaper and was registered as a newspaper. From January 2019, it is a glossy magazine.

== Publishers ==
The original publisher was the Law Newspaper Company Limited.

The journal was formerly published by Longman Group UK Ltd. Longman Law, Tax and Finance then became FT Law & Tax, a subsidiary of Financial Times Professional Ltd and part of Pearson Professional Limited, and the journal was published by FT Law & Tax. FT Law & Tax became part of the Sweet & Maxwell Group in 1998. The journal was bought from Sweet & Maxwell in November 2002 or in 2003 by Wilmington plc who published it until September 2017. It has been published by International In-house Counsel Journal Limited a company with a registered office in Cambridge and a principal trading address in King's Lynn, since January 2019.

The journal formerly had its headquarters in London.

== Editors ==
Editors included William Shaen, Alexander Edward Miller, William Mitchell Fawcett (from 1872 to 1912), John Mason Lightwood (from 1912 to 1925), David Hughes Parry (from 1925 to 1928), John Robert Perceval-Maxwell (from 1928 to 1929), Thomas Cunliffe (from 1929 to 1948), John Passmore Widgery (from 1948 to 1955), Philip Asterley Jones (from 1956 to 1968), Neville David Vandyk (from 1 April 1968 to 1988), Julian Harris and Marie Staunton (from 1990 to 1997)

== Law reports and citation ==
The Solicitors Journal publishes law reports. For the purposes of citation, its name may be abbreviated to "SJ" or "Sol Jo", while "Solicitors' Journal and Reporter" may be abbreviated to "Sol J & R".

== History ==
The Solicitors Journal replaced the Legal Observer and Solicitors Journal, also known as the Legal Observer (1830–1856). The Weekly Reporter (1853–1906) merged into the Solicitors Journal. The Weekly Reporter's common law editor from 1862 to 1866 was Standish Grove Grady.
