= Philip Asterley Jones =

British politician (1914–1978)

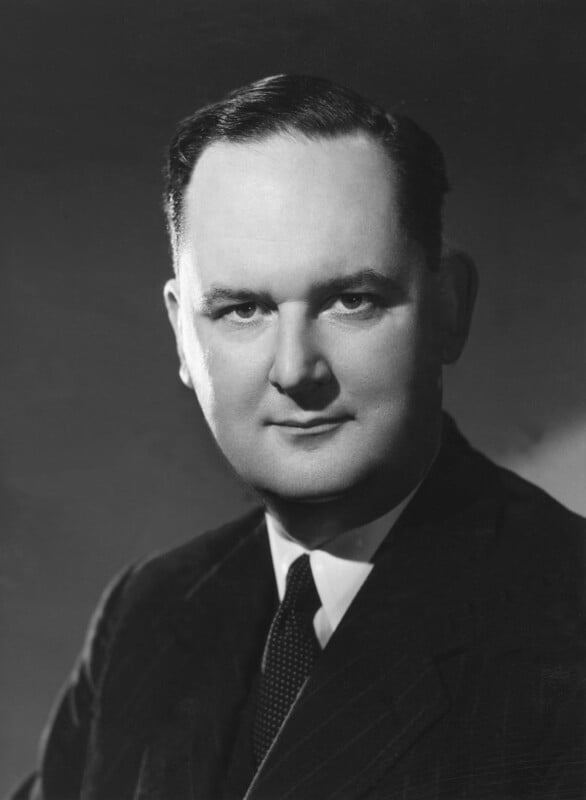
Jones in 1950

Philip Asterley Jones (21 June 1914 – 23 October 1978) was a British solicitor and politician.

Born in Duffield, Jones was educated at Tonbridge School, and then at the Law Society's School, and qualified as a solicitor in 1937. He joined the Labour Party and served on St Albans City Council from 1938 until 1940, but he joined the Royal Army Service Corps and served with it from 1939, becoming a major by 1943.

Jones was Labour Member of Parliament (MP) for Hitchin from 1945 to 1950. After his defeat, he served as the editor of the Local Government Chronicle from 1950 to 1963, and as editor of the Solicitors Journal from 1956 to 1968. He was joint author and editor of the first eight editions of the book now called Card, Cross and Jones: Criminal Law.

From 1975 until 1977, Jones served as the head of the department of law at the City of Birmingham Polytechnic.

Parliament of the United Kingdom
Preceded by Seymour Berry	Member of Parliament for Hitchin; 1945 – 1950	Succeeded by Nigel Fisher
