= Adrian Berry, 4th Viscount Camrose =

British writer and noble

Adrian Michael Berry, 4th Viscount Camrose (15 June 1937 – 19 April 2016) was a British hereditary peer and journalist

== Early life and education ==
Berry was born in 1937, the elder son of Michael Berry, who was created Lord Hartwell in 1968 and who disclaimed the family title of Viscount Camrose in 1995, by his marriage to Lady Pamela Smith, younger daughter of F. E. Smith, 1st Earl of Birkenhead. He was educated at Eton and Christ Church, Oxford.

== Career ==
From 1977 until 1996, Camrose was the science correspondent of The Daily Telegraph. On stepping down from that position he became the paper's Consulting Editor (Science).

He was a Fellow of the Royal Geographical Society, a Fellow of the Royal Astronomical Society, and a Fellow of the British Interplanetary Society.

=== Climate change ===
In his article published in The Sunday Telegraph in 2015, Berry denied the scientific consensus on climate change by claiming that climate change "has more to do with the violent outbursts of energy that our solar system meets on its eternal passage through the Milky Way" than with carbon dioxide. Berry served on the advisory committee of the Global Warming Policy Foundation, a think tank that promotes climate-change denial and claims that policies proposed by governments to mitigate anthropogenic global warming are "extremely damaging and harmful".

== Marriage and family ==
On 4 January 1967, Berry married Marina Beatrice Sulzberger, daughter of Cyrus Leo Sulzberger II (whose family owns The New York Times) and Marina Tatiana Ladas. The couple had two children:

- Hon Jessica Margaret Berry (born 11 February 1968)
- Jonathan William Berry, 5th Viscount Camrose (born 26 February 1970)

== Publications ==
- The next ten thousand years: a vision of man's future in the universes (London: Cape, 1974), ISBN 0-340-19924-5
- The iron sun: crossing the universe through black holes (London: Cape, 1977), ISBN 0-340-23231-5
- From apes to astronauts (London: Daily Telegraph, 1980), ISBN 0-901684-60-0
- High skies and yellow rain (London: Daily Telegraph, 1983)
- The super-intelligent machine: an electronic odyssey (London: Cape, 1983), ISBN 0-224-01967-8
- The Next 500 Years (London: Headline, 1995), ISBN 0-7472-4395-6
- Ice With Your Evolution (1986), ISBN 0-245-54394-5
- Galileo and the dolphins: amazing but true stories from science (London: B.T. Batsford, 1996), ISBN 0-7134-8067-X
- The giant leap: mankind heads for the stars (London: Headline, 1999; rev. edn, London: Headline, 2000), ISBN 0-7472-1977-X

== Arms ==
Coat of arms of Adrian Berry, 4th Viscount Camrose
Crest A griffin sejant reguardant Sable collared Or. Escutcheon Argent three bars Gules over all a pile Ermine. Supporters On either side a wolf Proper gorged with a collar Or pendent therefrom an escutcheon Sable charged with two pens in saltire Argent. Motto Vivere Virtute (To Live In Virtue)

== Sources ==
- Debrett's People of Today (12th edn, London: Debrett's Peerage, 1999), p. 157

Peerage of the United Kingdom
Disclaimed Title last held by (William) Michael Berry	Viscount Camrose; 2001–2016	Succeeded by Jonathan William Berry
