= Viscount Camrose =

Title in the British peerage

Viscount Camrose, of Hackwood Park in the County of Hampshire, is a title in the Peerage of the United Kingdom. It was created on 20 January 1941 for the prominent newspaper magnate William Berry, 1st Baron Camrose. He had previously received the award of Baronet, of Long Cross in the County of Surrey, in the Baronetage of the United Kingdom, on 4 July 1921, and was created Baron Camrose, of Long Cross in the County of Surrey, on 19 June 1929, in the Peerage of the United Kingdom. His second son, the third Viscount, disclaimed the peerages in 1995 on succeeding his elder brother. However, he had already been created a life peer as Baron Hartwell, of Peterborough Court in the City of London, on 19 January 1968. On his death in 2001 the life peerage became extinct while he was succeeded in the other titles by his eldest son, the fourth Viscount. The first three Viscounts all headed The Daily Telegraph at one point, the first having purchased it from the 1st Viscount Burnham, but in the 1980s they lost control to Conrad Black.

The first Viscount was the younger brother of the 1st Baron Buckland, the industrialist, and the elder brother of the 1st Viscount Kemsley, his fellow 'press baron'.

In a March 2022 by-election, the 5th Viscount was elected to replace Lord Rotherwick in the House of Lords following Rotherwick's retirement in February 2022.

== Viscounts Camrose (1941) ==
- William Ewart Berry, 1st Viscount Camrose (1879–1954)
- John Seymour Berry, 2nd Viscount Camrose (1909–1995)
- William Michael Berry, 3rd Viscount Camrose, Baron Hartwell (1911–2001) (disclaimed 1995)
- Adrian Michael Berry, 4th Viscount Camrose (1937–2016)
- Jonathan William Berry, 5th Viscount Camrose (b. 1970)

The heir apparent is the present holder's elder son, the Hon. Hugo William Berry (b. 2000)

== Arms ==
Coat of arms of Viscount Camrose
Crest A griffin sejant reguardant Sable collared Or. Escutcheon Argent three bars Gules over all a pile Ermine. Supporters On either side a wolf Proper gorged with a collar Or pendent therefrom an escutcheon Sable charged with two pens in saltire Argent. Motto Vivere Virtute (To Live In Virtue)

== Line of Succession ==
- William Ewart Berry, 1st Viscount Camrose (1879–1954)
  - William Michael Berry, Baron Hartwell (1911–2001) Disclaimed Viscountcy
    - Adrian Michael Berry, 4th Viscount Camrose (1937–2016)
      - Jonathan William Berry, 5th Viscount Camrose (born 1970)
        - (1) Hon. Hugo William Berry (b. 2000)
        - (2) Hon. Tobias Furneaux Berry (b. 2003)
    - Hon. Nicholas William Berry (1942–2016)
      - (3) William Alexander Berry (b. 1978)
  - Col. Hon. Julian Berry (1920–1988)
    - (4) Simon Ewert Berry (b. 1955)

== See also ==
- Baron Buckland
- Viscount Kemsley
