= Seymour Berry, 2nd Viscount Camrose =

British nobleman, politician, and newspaper proprietor (1909–1995)

The Right Honourable The Viscount Camrose TD

Member of Parliament for Hitchin
- In office 1941–1945
- Preceded by: Sir Arnold Wilson
- Succeeded by: Philip Asterley Jones

Personal details
- Born: 12 July 1909 Surrey, England
- Died: 15 February 1995 (aged 85) Westminster, London
- Party: Conservative
- Spouse: Joan Yarde-Buller (m. 1986–1995)
- Parents: William Berry (father); Mary Agnes Corns (mother)
- Relatives: Michael Berry (brother)
- Education: Eton College
- Alma mater: Christ Church, Oxford
- Military career
- Allegiance: United Kingdom
- Branch: British Army
- Service years: 1938-45
- Rank: Major
- Units: 11th Anti-Aircraft Division; City of London Yeomanry
- Conflicts: World War II; Operation Torch
- Awards: TD

John Seymour Berry, 2nd Viscount Camrose TD (12 July 1909 – 15 February 1995) was a British nobleman, politician, and newspaper proprietor.

== Early life ==
Berry was born in Surrey on 12 July 1909, the eldest son of William Berry, later first Viscount Camrose and first Baronet Berry of Hackwood Park, and Mary Agnes Berry, née Corns. His younger brother was Michael Berry (1911–2001).

He was educated at Eton College and Christ Church, Oxford, where he was tutored by Sir Roy Harrod.

== Career ==
Berry began his career working for his family's provincial paper in Newcastle. He next worked for their papers in Manchester and Glasgow. In March 1938 he joined the 11th Anti-Aircraft Light Regiment. He later commanded an independent battery in Operation Torch when the Allied forces invaded North Africa. He was Deputy Chairman of The Daily Telegraph from 1939 to 1987 and Vice Chairman of Amalgamated Press from 1942 to 1959.

On 10 March 1941, he was elected Member of Parliament (Conservative) for Hitchin in the by-election held after Sir Arnold Wilson was killed on active service. He held his seat until 1945, when it was won by Philip Asterley Jones (Labour).

Coterminously, he served in the City of London Yeomanry (Rough Riders). He saw active service in North Africa and Italy, rose to the rank of Major, was mentioned in despatches, and was awarded the Territorial Efficiency Decoration (TD).

=== Succession ===
He succeeded to his father's viscountcy and baronetcy on 15 June 1954, and took his seat in the House of Lords on 5 May 1955.

== Personal life ==
At the age of seventy-six, and following a discreet friendship of more than thirty years, Lord Camrose married the Honourable Joan Yarde-Buller, daughter of Sir John Yarde-Buller, 3rd Baron Churston and Denise Orme who later married Edward FitzGerald, 7th Duke of Leinster. Lady Camrose had been married twice previously, firstly to Loel Guinness, and secondly to Prince Aly Khan, son and heir presumptive of Aga Khan III. Prince Aly was disinherited and consequently Lady Camrose's son Karīm succeeded as Aga Khan IV. Lady Camrose was also known as Princess Joan and Princess Tajudaullah.

Lord Camrose died aged 85 in Westminster, London, without issue, on 15 February 1995. He was survived by his wife, while the viscountcy and the baronetcy were inherited by his brother, Michael Berry, Baron Hartwell, who disclaimed the viscountcy for life.

== Arms ==
Coat of arms of Seymour Berry, 2nd Viscount Camrose
Crest A griffin sejant reguardant Sable collared Or. Escutcheon Argent three bars Gules over all a pile Ermine. Supporters On either side a wolf Proper gorged with a collar Or pendent therefrom an escutcheon Sable charged with two pens in saltire Argent. Motto Vivere Virtute (To Live In Virtue)

Parliament of the United Kingdom
Preceded by Sir Arnold Wilson	Member of Parliament for Hitchin; 1941–1945	Succeeded by Philip Asterley Jones
Peerage of the United Kingdom
Preceded by William Berry	Viscount Camrose; 1954–1995	Succeeded by Michael Berry
