= Maurice Batho =

Sir Maurice Benjamin Batho, 2nd Baronet (14 January 1910 – 12 January 1990) was an English baronet.

Batho was the son of Sir Charles Albert Batho, 1st Baronet, and Bessie née Parker. He was educated at Uppingham School. In 1934 he married Antoinette d’Udekem d’Acoz: they had four children, two sons and two daughters. During World War II he served with the King's Royal Rifle Corps

== Notes ==
Baronetage of the United Kingdom
Preceded by Charles Batho	Baronet (of Frinton); 1938–1990	Succeeded by Peter Batho
