= Wilmington plc =

British publisher

Wilmington plc is a publishing firm and provider of information and training, specialising in compliance, legal and healthcare publications. The company was established in 1995 and has its headquarters Whitechapel High Street, London.

It publishes:

- Compliance Week, headquartered in Boston, Massachusetts
- Health Service Journal
- Pension Funds Online

In 2000, Wilmington acquired Binley's, a provider of NHS healthcare intelligence and tools for (amongst others) pharmaceutical supplier sales organisations. Binley's was later merged into the Health Service Journal, but retained its OnMedica website, a reference and news source for UK-based GPs and speciality doctors.

It sold What Wine? to William Reed Publishing in December 2005.

Mercia Group, a provider of accountancy training, was acquired in 2006.

It bought Press Gazette in 2006 and sold it in 2009.

Wilmington bought NHiS ("NHS Insights") in 2013.

Wellards, an e-learning provider for salespeople in pharmaceuticals and medical technology, was acquired in 2016 and rebranded as the Digital Learning Academy.

It bought the Health Service Journal from Ascential in January 2017.

Wilmington published the long-established Solicitors Journal from the 1990s until closing it in 2017.

== Financials ==
In the year ended 30 June 2019, Wilmington plc reported profit before tax of £14.7m on revenue of £122.5m.
