= Viscount Kemsley =

Viscountcy in the Peerage of the United Kingdom

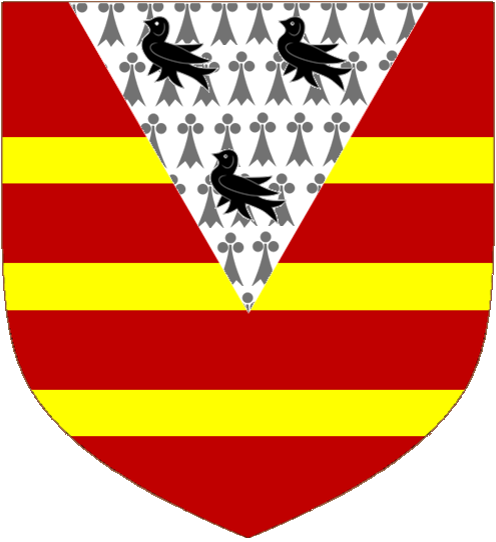
Gules three Bars Or on a Pile Ermine as many Martlets Sable.

Viscount Kemsley is a hereditary title in the Peerage of the United Kingdom, created in 1945 for the press baron Gomer Berry.

Created a Baronet, of Dropmore in the County of Buckingham, on 25 January 1928, in the baronetage of the United Kingdom then, in 1936, raised to the peerage of the United Kingdom as Baron Kemsley, of Farnham Royal in the County of Buckingham, Berry was the younger brother of the industrialist Henry Berry, 1st Baron Buckland, and of fellow newspaper magnate William Berry, 1st Viscount Camrose. As of 2025 the titles are held by his grandson, the third Viscount, who succeeded his uncle in 1999.

The Conservative politician the Hon. Sir Anthony Berry was the youngest son of the first Viscount Kemsley.

The family seat is Church Hill Farm, near Brockenhurst, Hampshire.

== Viscounts Kemsley (1945) ==
- (James) Gomer Berry, 1st Viscount Kemsley (1883–1968)
- (Geoffrey) Lionel Berry, 2nd Viscount Kemsley (1909–1999)
- Richard Gomer Berry, 3rd Viscount Kemsley (born 1951)

The heir apparent is the present viscount's son, Hon. Luke Gomer Berry (born 1998).

== Line of succession ==
- (James) Gomer Berry, 1st Viscount Kemsley (1883–1968)
  - (Geoffrey) Lionel Berry, 2nd Viscount Kemsley (1909–1999)
  - Major Hon. Denis Gomer Berry (1911–1983)
    - Richard Gomer Berry, 3rd Viscount Kemsley (born 1951)
      - (1) Hon. Luke Gomer Berry (born 1998)
      - (2) Hon. Jessamine Eleanor Berry (born 1999)
  - Hon. Sir Anthony George Berry (1925–1984)
    - (3) Edward Anthony Morys Berry (born 1960)
      - (4) William Anthony Edward Berry (born 1993)
    - (5) George Raymond Gomer Berry (born 1967)

== See also ==
- Viscount Camrose
- Baron Buckland
