= Brunton =

Brunton may refer to:

== Places ==
- Brunton, Northumberland, England (near Alnwick)
- Low Brunton, Northumberland, England (near Hexham)
- Brunton, Wiltshire, England
- Brunton Memorial Ground, Radlett, Hertfordshire, England
- Brunton, Fife, Scotland; a location in the U.K.

== Other uses ==
- Brunton (surname)
- Brunton, Inc., manufacturers of the Brunton compass

== See also ==
- Colmar Brunton, a market research company
- Brunton compass
