= Winslade =

Village and parish in Hampshire, England

Coordinates: 51.2285°N 1.0634°W

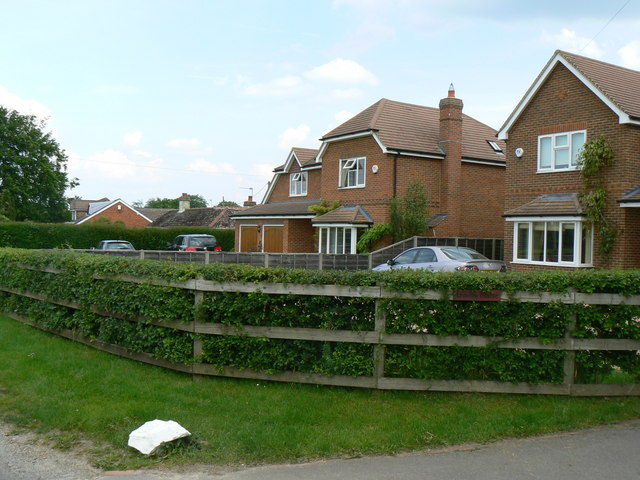
- Modern houses in Hackwood Lane

- Location within Hampshire
- Population: 224 (Tunworth, Weston Corbett, Weston Patrick and Winslade 2011 Census)
- OS grid reference: SU654481
- Civil parish: Winslade
- District: Basingstoke and Deane
- Shire county: Hampshire
- Region: South East
- Country: England
- Sovereign state: United Kingdom
- Post town: Basingstoke
- Postcode district: RG25
- Dialling code: 01256
- Police: Hampshire and Isle of Wight
- Fire: Hampshire and Isle of Wight
- Ambulance: South Central
- UK Parliament: Basingstoke

Winslade is a hamlet and civil parish in the Basingstoke and Deane district of Hampshire, England. It lies 3 miles (4.8 km) south of Basingstoke, just off the A339 road. The hamlet covers an area of 712 acres (288 ha) and has an average elevation of 550 feet (170 m). Its nearest railway station is Basingstoke, 4.2 miles (6.8 km) north of the hamlet. The parish of Winslade contains the vast Hackwood Park, an 89-acre (36 ha) Grade I listed Royal deer park. According to the 2011 census, Winslade, along with Tunworth, Weston Corbett and Weston Patrick, had a population of 224.

The manor of Winslade was held by Hugh de Port and his descendants from 1086 until 1555, after which it was bought by William Paulet, 1st Marquess of Winchester. Hackwood Park was also acquired by Winchester, and was used as a deer hunting park until the 20th century. Winslade contains 42 Grade II listed buildings, including Hackwood House, a Grade II* listed building. Its church, dedicated to St Mary, dates from 1816 and was Grade II listed on 26 April 1957.

== History ==
The hamlet's name has been spelled in various ways, including Winesflot (11th century), Wineslode (13th century), Wynesflode (14th century), and Wyndslade (16th century). The parish of Winslade formerly included the village of Kempshott, which covered an area of 555 acres (225 ha), but was merged with Winslade in 1393. It formed a part of Winslade until 1876, when it was ceded to Dummer's parish under the Divided Parishes Act. Hackwood Park was acquired by William Paulet, 1st Marquess of Winchester in the 16th century and was used as a Royal deer park until the early 20th century.

The earliest mention of the manor of Winslade was made in 1086, when it was held by landowner Hugh de Port. In 1275, Winslade was owned by John de St John for "half a knight's fee" by Alan de Hagheman, who purchased the manor a year later. In 1316, the manor was passed to John de Knolle, who then granted it to John de Tichborne after his death in 1331. The manor had continued in his ownership by his descendants until 1555 when the manor was sold by William, Marquis of Winchester. William died in the same year he sold it, and consequently the land was passed onto his son Francis of Bolton, who was fined four shillings (equivalent to £26,700 in 2017) as lord of both Winslade and Kempshott for not attending the court of Basingstoke Hundred in 1560. It was sold to his overlord, John Marquess of Winchester, two years later, and his descendants continued to hold it until at least 1908. According to the 1901 census, Winslade had a population of 59.

The Basingstoke and Alton Light Railway ran through the area (c1901 - 1932). There is mention of a tunnel near Winslade although there was no station. Basingstoke and Alton Light Railway

== Geography and demographics ==
Winslade is located in the northern central part of Hampshire, in South East England, 3 miles (4.8 km) south of Basingstoke, its nearest town. The hamlet falls under the North East Hampshire parliament constituency, represented in the House of Commons by Conservative MP Ranil Jayawardena. The nearest schools to Winslade are those situated in Basingstoke, including St John's Church of English Primary School, Brighton Hill Community School, and Basingstoke College of Technology. The parish covers an area of 712 acres (288 ha), and has an average elevation of approximately 550 feet (170 m) above sea level. The landscape is dominated by woodland and plantations, with the soil being mostly clay, the subsoil of chalk, and the most prominent crops being wheat, barley, oats and turnips. The parish contains Hackwood Park, an 89-acre (36 ha) Grade I listed Royal deer hunting park, which lies to the north.

According to the 2011 census, the parishes of Winslade, Tunworth, Weston Corbett and Weston Patrick collectively had a population of 224 people, of which 34.6% were in full-time employment, lower than the national average of 37.70%. There are 95 households in the four parishes with an average size of 2.36 people.

=== Climate ===
Due to its location in south central England and its proximity to the sea, the average maximum temperature in January is 7.2 °C (45 °F) with the average minimum being 1.6 °C (35 °F). The average maximum temperature in July is 21.9 °C (71 °F), with the average minimum being 12.5 °C (55 °F). The hamlet gets around 755 millimetres (29.7 in) of rain a year, with a minimum of 1 mm (0.04 in) of rain reported on 103 days a year.

Climate data for Odiham weather station (nearest to Winslade), Odiham, elevation: 9 metres (30 feet) (1981–2010)
Month	Jan	Feb	Mar	Apr	May	Jun	Jul	Aug	Sep	Oct	Nov	Dec	Year
Mean daily maximum °C (°F)	7.2 (45.0)	7.4 (45.3)	10.3 (50.5)	13.0 (55.4)	16.6 (61.9)	19.5 (67.1)	21.9 (71.4)	21.6 (70.9)	18.5 (65.3)	14.4 (57.9)	10.3 (50.5)	7.4 (45.3)	14.1 (57.4)
Mean daily minimum °C (°F)	1.6 (34.9)	1.3 (34.3)	3.0 (37.4)	4.4 (39.9)	7.5 (45.5)	10.4 (50.7)	12.5 (54.5)	12.4 (54.3)	10.2 (50.4)	7.4 (45.3)	4.2 (39.6)	1.8 (35.2)	6.4 (43.5)
Average precipitation mm (inches)	77.8 (3.06)	56.0 (2.20)	54.8 (2.16)	52.6 (2.07)	52.2 (2.06)	48.5 (1.91)	50.2 (1.98)	52.1 (2.05)	61.8 (2.43)	87.2 (3.43)	83.9 (3.30)	78.5 (3.09)	755.5 (29.74)
Average precipitation days	12.2	9.8	10.5	9.5	9.5	8.6	8.4	8.6	8.9	11.7	11.7	11.5	120.9
Source: Met Office

== Notable landmarks ==
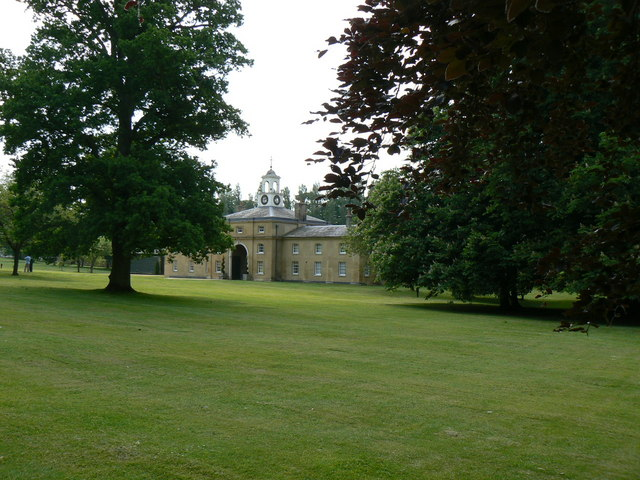
Hackwood House from the west side

The parish of Winslade contains a total of 42 listed buildings—the majority of which are located in Hackwood Park—including three Grade II* listed. Hackwood House is an imposing mansion of symmetrical design, with the original structure dating from 1680. The exterior has four Neo-classical columns, which are situated in front of pilasters raised from the main wall surface. The central doorway is housed in an oval recess and also contains two columns and pilasters at the side. The interior of Hackwood House contains panelling and a large fireplace of late 17th century style, with a carved ornamental festoon brought from Abbotstone House in Wiltshire.

Other listed buildings in Hackwood Park are the fishing temple, a once-domed building with eight columns and an incomplete circular stone base, a 19th-century teahouse pavilion, a single story mid-18th century orangey, a statue of George I which dates from 1722, and a late 19th-century mill house. Grade II* listed buildings include an early 19th-century stable block and riding school, and a menagerie pond pavilion, which dates from 1727 and was given as a gift by James Gibbs to the third Duke of Bolton.

The church of St Mary is a plain rectangular plan with a yellow brick tower and slate roofing. Although the site is old, the present church dates from 1816 and was Grade II listed on 26 April 1957. The church is described as a "rather unattractive building" with plastered walls, weathered stone bands and slender openings. Another place of worship was the Winslade Congregational Chapel, which is situated near a footpath leading to the villages of Herriard and Ellisfield. The chapel was opened in October 1888 by the fifth Earl of Portsmouth and Thomas Maton Kingdon, an ironmonger from Basingstoke. The deacons of London Street in Basingstoke decided to close it in 1930 and was eventually sold to the Portsmouth Estate five years later for £35 (equivalent to £2,152 in 2025).
