= Lionel Berry, 2nd Viscount Kemsley =

British politician (1909–1999)

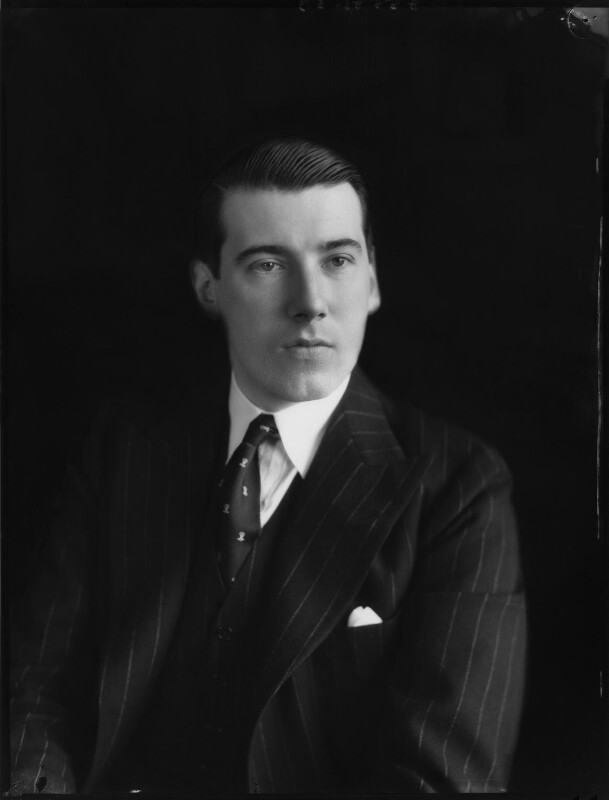
Lord Kemsley in 1939

(Geoffrey) Lionel Berry, 2nd Viscount Kemsley (29 June 1909 – 28 February 1999), was a British Conservative politician, hereditary peer and newspaper editor.

== Biography ==
Berry was born in Hendon. His father was Gomer Berry, 1st Viscount Kemsley (1883–1968), a prominent newspaper baron, owner of titles including The Sunday Times and the Daily Record.

Berry served in the Grenadier Guards during World War II until he was invalided in 1942. The following year 1943, in a wartime by-election on 4 April, he was elected unopposed as Member of Parliament (MP) for Buckingham. However, he lost his seat to Labour at the 1945 general election.

Berry was managing editor of the Daily Sketch and later Deputy Chairman of Kemsley Newspapers Limited. He succeeded as Viscount Kemsley upon his father's death in 1968. By then, his father's newspaper business had been sold off and Berry played no further part in it.

== Marriage and family ==
Berry married Lady Helene Candida Hay (5 September 1913 - 4 January 2011), eldest daughter of William George Montagu Hay, 11th Marquess of Tweeddale, on 21 June 1933.

They had four daughters:

- Hon Mary Anne Berry (born 30 April 1934)
- Hon Pamela Jane Marguerite Berry (27 May 1937 - 13 December 2013)
- Hon Caroline Helen Berry (born 8 September 1942)
- Hon Catherine Frances Lilian Berry (born 9 June 1944)

Berry died aged 89 in 1999 in Harborough, Leicestershire, and was succeeded in the viscountcy by his nephew, Richard Gomer Berry.

Parliament of the United Kingdom
Preceded by John Whiteley	Member of Parliament for Buckingham; 1943–1945	Succeeded by Aidan Crawley
Peerage of the United Kingdom
Preceded by Gomer Berry	Viscount Kemsley; 1968–1999	Succeeded by Richard Berry
