= Rowland Blades, 1st Baron Ebbisham =

British politician

The Right Honourable The Lord Ebbisham GBE JP FSA
- Lord Ebbisham, by Walter Stoneman, 1948

Lord Mayor of London
- In office 1926–1927

Member of Parliament for Epsom
- In office 1918–1928

Personal details
- Born: George Rowland Blades; 15 April 1868 Sydenham, Kent, England
- Died: 24 May 1953 (aged 85)
- Occupation: Printer

George Rowland Blades, 1st Baron Ebbisham (15 April 1868 – 24 May 1953) was an English Conservative politician, printer, and Lord Mayor of London.

Blades was born in Sydenham, Kent, and educated at King's College School. In 1886, he joined the family printing business, Blades, East & Blades Ltd, which had been founded by his grandfather, rising to become its chairman.

In 1913 he was elected to the Corporation of London. He served as Sheriff of London from 1917 to 1918 and during his term of office was knighted when the King and Queen visited the City of London to celebrate their silver wedding. He was elected as 599th Lord Mayor of London for 1926–27.

On 23 April 1918 he was co-opted as a member of the London County Council for the Municipal Reform Party, representing the City of London.

In 1918 he was elected to Parliament for Epsom and held the seat until 1928, when he resigned by taking the Chiltern Hundreds. He was created a Baronet in the 1922 New Year Honours and appointed Knight Grand Cross of the Order of the British Empire (GBE) in September 1927. In the 1928 Birthday Honours, he was raised to the peerage as Baron Ebbisham, the old name of Epsom (since the title of Baron Epsom was already held by the Earl of Rosebery).

He was interested in cricket and in 1921 hosted a dinner at the House of Commons for J. H. Mason, captain of the touring Philadelphia Pilgrims.

== Arms ==
Coat of arms of Rowland Blades, 1st Baron Ebbisham
| Crest Issuant from a mural crown Or a talbot's head Sable between two branches of oak fructed Proper. Escutcheon Azure on a saltire between four pheons Argent a portcullis chained Sable on a chief Or a lion passant Gules. Supporters On either side a talbot Sable charged on the shoulder with a portcullis chained Or encircled by a chaplet of oak Proper tied Gold. Motto Pro Deo Rege Et Patria (For God King And Country) |

== Footnotes ==
Parliament of the United Kingdom
| Preceded by Henry Keswick | Member of Parliament for Epsom; 1918–1928 | Succeeded by Archibald Southby |
Baronetage of the United Kingdom
| New creation | Baronet (of Cobham, Surrey); 1922–1953 | Succeeded by Rowland Blades |
Peerage of the United Kingdom
| New creation | Baron Ebbisham; 1928–1953 | Succeeded by Rowland Blades |
