= Borthwick baronets of Whitburgh (1908) =

Escutcheon of the Borthwick baronets of Whitburgh

The Borthwick baronetcy, of Whitburgh in Humbie in the County of Haddington, was created in the Baronetage of the United Kingdom on 21 July 1908 for Thomas Borthwick, a meat importer. He was Chairman of Thomas Borthwick & Sons, colonial merchants. In June 1912 he was nominated for a peerage, but died in July of the same year, before the patent had passed the Great Seal; on 10 December 1912 his eldest son Thomas Borthwick, the 2nd Baronet, was created Baron Whitburgh, of Whitburgh in the County of Midlothian, in the Peerage of the United Kingdom. Furthermore, in February 1913 the 1st Baronet's widow Letitia Mary was given Royal licence to use the style of Baroness Whitburgh.

The peerage became extinct on Lord Whitburgh's death in 1967, while he was succeeded in the baronetcy by his nephew, the 3rd Baronet. He was the only son of the Hon. James Alexander Borthwick, second son of the 1st Baronet. The 4th Baronet Sir Antony Thomas Borthwick succeeded his father in 2002.

== Borthwick baronets, of Whitburgh (1908) ==
- Sir Thomas Borthwick, 1st Baronet (1835–1912)
- Sir Thomas Banks Borthwick, 2nd Baronet (1874–1967) (created Baron Whitburgh in 1912)

== Barons Whitburgh (1912) ==
- Thomas Banks Borthwick, 1st Baron Whitburgh (1874–1967)

== Borthwick baronets, of Whitburgh (1908; reverted) ==
- Sir John Thomas Borthwick, 3rd Baronet (1917–2002)
- Sir Antony Thomas Borthwick, 4th Baronet (born 1941)

The heir apparent is the present holder's son Matthew Thomas Thurston Borthwick (born 1968).

== Notes ==
Baronetage of the United Kingdom
Preceded by Cheyne baronets	Borthwick baronets of Whitburgh; 21 July 1908	Succeeded by Kearley baronets
