= Gomer Berry, 1st Viscount Kemsley =

Welsh colliery owner and newspaper publisher (1883–1968)

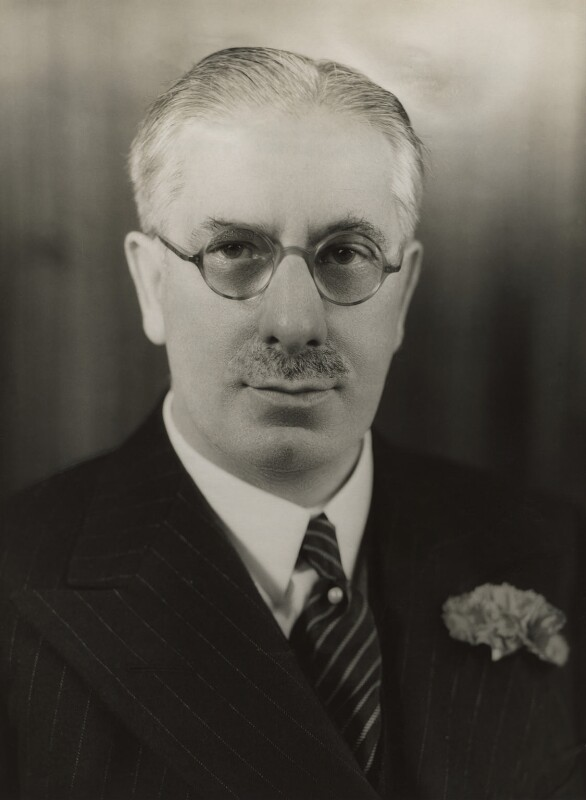
Berry in 1938

James Gomer Berry, 1st Viscount Kemsley, GBE (7 May 1883 – 6 February 1968) was a Welsh colliery owner and newspaper publisher.

== Background ==
Berry was born the son of John Mathias and Mary Ann (née Rowe) Berry, of Merthyr Tydfil in Wales. He was the younger brother of Henry Berry, 1st Baron Buckland, an industrialist, and William Berry, 1st Viscount Camrose, a fellow press lord.

== Career ==
Berry entered the newspaper business in 1915, purchasing The Sunday Times along with his second brother William Berry. In 1922, Berry bought the Scottish Daily Record, its sister paper the Sunday Mail, and another newspaper, the Glasgow Evening News, for £1 million. He formed a controlling company known as Associated Scottish Newspapers Ltd.

In 1924, the Berry Brothers and Sir Edward Iliffe (later 1st Baron Iliffe) formed Allied Newspapers. The consortium's initial acquisitions included the Daily Dispatch, the Manchester Evening Chronicle, the Sunday Chronicle, and the Sunday Graphic, as well as a string of other newspapers across the country, including the Welsh newspaper the Western Mail. In 1927, the Berrys purchased The Daily Telegraph from Lord Burnham.

In 1945, after the dissolution of Allied Newspapers, Kemsley founded Kemsley Newspapers, which owned The Sunday Times, The Daily Sketch and The Sunday Graphic amongst other titles.

Berry was chairman of the Reuters News Agency from 1951 to 1958.

In 1954, Berry was part of the Kemsley-Winnick consortium, which won the initial ITV weekend contracts for the Midlands and the North of England. Berry had cold feet over the financial risk, and withdrew, causing the consortium to collapse. In 1959, Kemsley Newspapers was bought by Lord Thomson, ironically enabled by Thomson's profits from Scottish Television. At the time of the sale, Lord Kemsley was editor-in-chief of The Sunday Times; his son Lionel Berry, 2nd Viscount Kemsley, was deputy chairman.)

== Honours ==
Berry was created a baronet in 1928, and was appointed as an Officer of the Most Venerable Order of the Hospital of St John of Jerusalem in 1931. In 1936, he was raised to the peerage as Baron Kemsley, of Farnham Royal in the County of Buckingham, and advanced to Viscount Kemsley, of Dropmore in the County of Buckingham, in 1945. In 1929 he was appointed High Sheriff of Buckinghamshire and in 1959, a Knight Grand Cross of the Order of the British Empire (GBE) for "political and public service".

== Marriages and children ==
Lord Kemsley married twice. He married firstly in 1907 Mary Lilian Holmes, daughter of Horace George Holmes and Mary Johnston née Macgregor, with whom he had six sons and a daughter:

- (Geoffrey) Lionel Berry, 2nd Viscount Kemsley (29 June 1909 - 28 February 1999)
- Major Hon Denis Gomer Berry (11 July 1911 - 30 September 1983), married firstly Rosemary Leonora Ruth de Rothschild. He and his second wife, Pamela Wellesley, were the parents of Richard Berry, 3rd Viscount Kemsley.
- Hon William Neville Berry (16 June 1914 - 19 May 1998)
- Hon John Douglas Berry (1 May 1916 - killed in action 10 October 1944)
- Hon Mary Pamela Berry (13 June 1918 - 29 January 1998)
- Flt Lt Hon Herbert Oswald Berry (13 June 1918 - 8 June 1952)
- Hon Sir Anthony George Berry (12 February 1925 - 12 October 1984)

His first wife died on 1 February 1928 and on 30 April 1931 he married Marie Edith Dresselhuys (née Merandon du Plessis), daughter of E. N. Merandon du Plessis, heir of an old British colonial sugar estate in Mauritius, and mother of socialite Ghislaine Dresselhuys from her first marriage. There were no children of this marriage.

== Death ==
Viscount Kemsley died in 1968 at the age of 84 and was buried in St Anne's churchyard, Dropmore. Marie Edith, Viscountess Kemsley OBE was buried with him following her death on 12 September 1976. He was succeeded in the viscountcy and other titles by his eldest son Lionel. His youngest son, Conservative politician the Honourable Sir Anthony Berry, was killed by the IRA in the 1984 Brighton hotel bombing.

== Works ==
As owner of Kemsley Newspapers, Viscount Kemsley made several written contributions to his in-house journal The Kemsley Writer.

Kemsley also oversaw the publication of the large format hardcover book The Kemsley Manual of Journalism (Cassell, 1950). Sub-titled A Comprehensive Guide to the Practice and Principles of Modern Journalism, this featured an introduction by Kemsley and an essay from his Foreign Manager Ian Fleming, later the author of the James Bond novels.

Peerage of the United Kingdom
New creation	Viscount Kemsley; 1945–1968	Succeeded by Geoffrey Lionel Berry
New creation	Baron Kemsley; 1936–1968	Succeeded by Geoffrey Lionel Berry
Baronetage of the United Kingdom
New creation	Baronet (of Dropmore); 1928–1968	Succeeded by Geoffrey Lionel Berry
