= Baron Ebbisham =

Title in the Peerage of the United Kingdom

Baron Ebbisham, of Cobham in the County of Surrey, was a title in the Peerage of the United Kingdom. It was created on 5 July 1928 for the businessman and Conservative politician Sir Rowland Blades, 1st Baronet. He had already been created a Baronet, of Epsom in the County of Surrey, in the Baronetage of the United Kingdom on 14 January 1922. The titles became extinct upon the death of his son, the second Baron, in 1991.

== Barons Ebbisham (1928) ==
- (George) Rowland Blades, 1st Baron Ebbisham (1868–1953)
- Rowland Roberts Blades, 2nd Baron Ebbisham (1912–1991)

== Arms ==
Coat of arms of Baron Ebbisham
Crest Issuant from a mural crown Or a talbot's head Sable between two branches of oak fructed Proper. Escutcheon Azure on a saltire between four pheons Argent a portcullis chained Sable on a chief Or a lion passant Gules. Supporters On either side a talbot Sable charged on the shoulder with a portcullis chained Or encircled by a chaplet of oak Proper tied Gold. Motto Pro Deo Rege Et Patria (For God King And Country)
