= Lauder Brunton =

British physician (1844–1916)

Sir Lauder Brunton Bt FRS
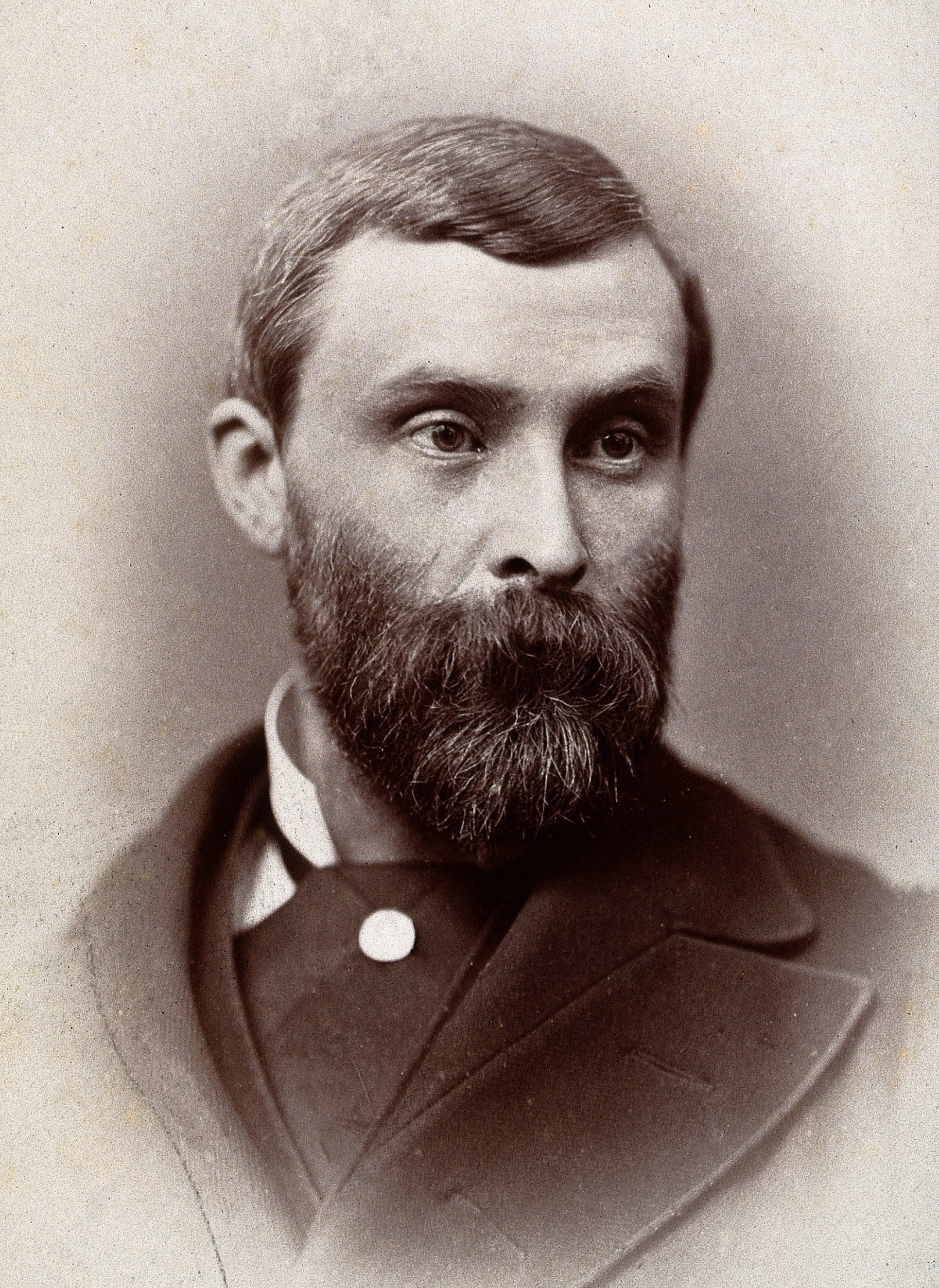
- Brunton in 1881
- Born: 14 March 1844; Roxburgh, Scotland
- Died: 16 September 1916 (aged 72); London, England
- Other name: Lauder Brunton
- Known for: Treatment of angina pectoris
- Spouse: Louisa Jane Stopford (m. 1879; died 1909)
- Awards: Cameron Prize for Therapeutics of the University of Edinburgh (1915)

Sir Thomas Lauder Brunton, 1st Baronet, FRS (14 March 1844 – 16 September 1916) was a British physician who is most-closely associated with the use of amyl nitrite to treat angina pectoris.

== Early life ==
Brunton was born on 14 March 1844 in Roxburgh in southeastern Scotland, the son of James Brunton (1781–1863) and his second wife Agnes Stenhouse (1807–1848). James's first wife was Euphemia Lauder (1794–1822), which gives explanation for his middle name, although he was not directly related to the Lauder's of the Bass. He studied medicine at the University of Edinburgh, beginning research into pharmacology while still a student there, and receiving a gold medal for his 1866 thesis on digitalis.

== Career ==
He left Edinburgh to work in Austria, the Netherlands, and Germany, returning to University College, London, and while there he was selected for a position at St. Bartholomew's Hospital. Brunton's clinical use of amyl nitrite to treat angina was inspired by earlier work with the same reagent by Arthur Gamgee and Benjamin Ward Richardson. Brunton reasoned that the pain and discomfort of angina could be reduced by administering amyl nitrite to open the coronary arteries of patients. In 1874, Brunton was made a Fellow of the Royal Society. He delivered the Goulstonian Lecture in 1877 on "Pharmacology and Therapeutics" and the Croonian Lecture in 1889 on "The Chemical structure of Physiological Action", both to the Royal College of Physicians. He was appointed a Knight Bachelor in the 1900 New Year Honours list, received the knighthood by Queen Victoria at Osborne House on 9 February 1900, and was made a baronet in 1908. In 1915, he was awarded the Cameron Prize for Therapeutics of the University of Edinburgh.

== Diabetes ==
Brunton favoured a low-carbohydrate high-fat diet to treat diabetes. In 1874, he recommended a diet consisting of butcher meat, fish, eggs and soup with butter, cheese, cream and oil. All fruit and vegetables apart from cress, lettuce and spinach were forbidden.

In The Lancet in 1894, Brunton stated that he was the first to use raw meat to treat diabetic patients in 1873. The results were not successful.

== Personal life ==
Brunton married Louisa Jane, daughter of Edward Stopford, Archdeacon of Meath, in 1879. She died in 1909.

He died in London on 16 September 1916, aged 72, and was buried on the eastern side of Highgate Cemetery. His memorial was designed by Sir Robert Lorimer. Lorimer also designed a plaque to Brunton in Bowden in Roxburghshire, erected in 1920.

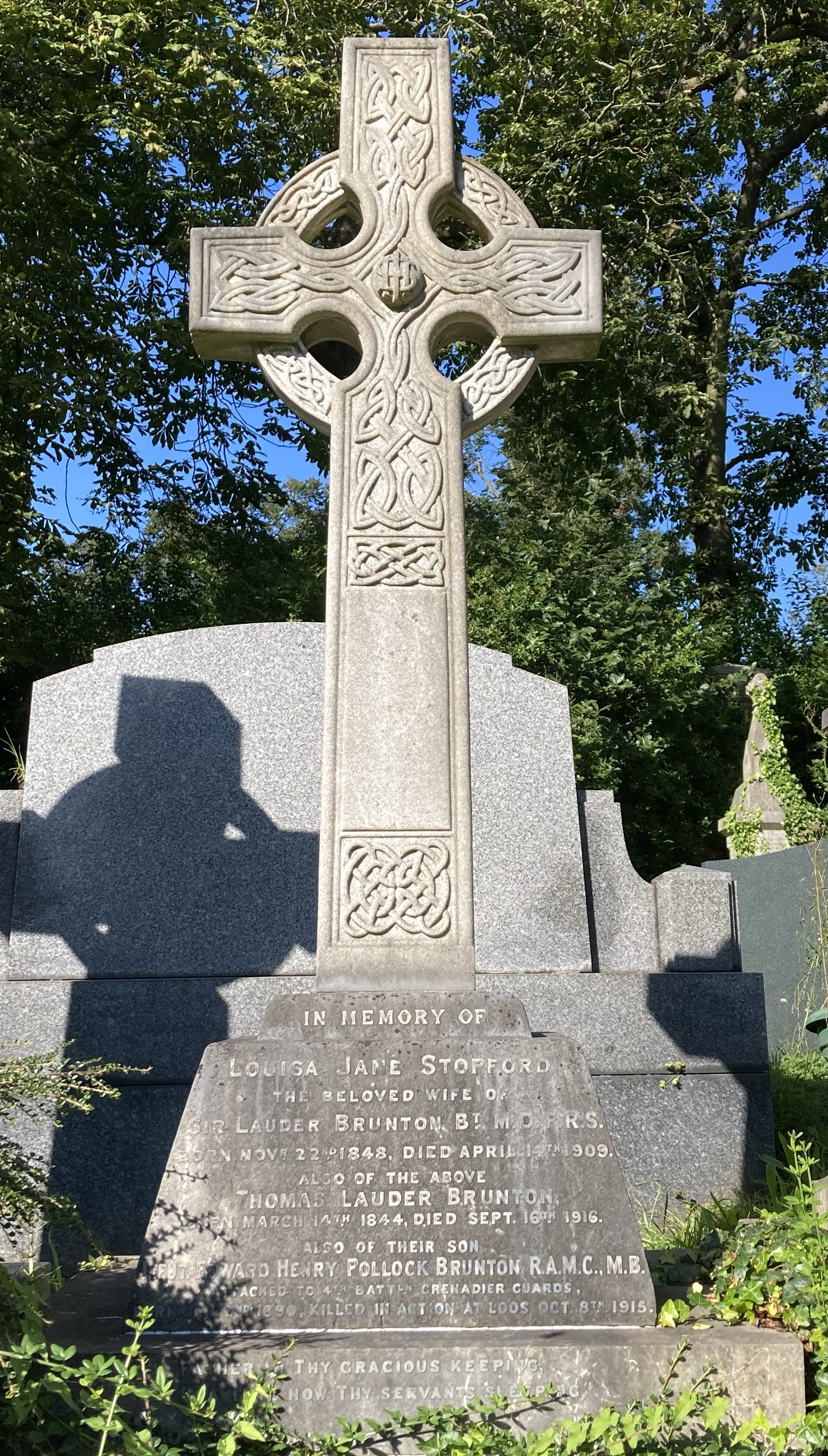
Family grave of Sir Thomas Lauder Brunton in Highgate Cemetery

He was succeeded in the baronetcy by his eldest son Stopford Brunton. Another son, Lt. Edward Brunton, was killed at the Battle of Loos.

Some of Brunton's papers are held at the National Library of Medicine.

== Selected publications ==
- Brunton, T. Lauder (1874). "The Pathology and Treatment of Diabetes Mellitus". The British Medical Journal. 1 (686): 221–224. doi:10.1136/bmj.1.686.221. PMC 2293828. PMID 20747395.
- Brunton, T. Lauder (1875). Experimental Investigation of the Action of Medicines. London: J. and A. Churchill.
- Brunton, T. Lauder (1880). Pharmacology and Therapeutics, or, Medicine Past and Present. London: Macmillan and Company.
- Brunton, T. Lauder (1885). A Textbook of Pharmacology, Therapeutics, and Materia Medica. London: Macmillan and Company.
- Brunton, T. Lauder (1886). On Disorders of Digestion, Their Consequences and Treatment. London: Macmillan and Company.
- Brunton, T. Lauder (1894). "Organs of Animals in the Treatment of Disease". The Lancet. 143 (3687): 1096–1097. doi:10.1016/S0140-6736(01)40529-0.
- Brunton, T. Lauder (1915). Therapeutics of the Circulation (2 ed.). New York: Paul E. Hoeber.

Baronetage of the United Kingdom
New creation	Baronet (of Stratford Place); 1908–1916	Succeeded by Stopford Brunton
