= Batho baronets =

Baronetcy in the Baronetage of the United Kingdom

The Batho Baronetcy, of Frinton in the County of Essex, is a title in the Baronetage of the United Kingdom, and was created on 19 October 1928 for Sir Charles Albert Batho. He was educated at Highgate School from 1882 to 1885, was an Alderman of the City of London from 1921 to 1938, and Lord Mayor of London from 1927 to 1928. As of 2007, the title is held by his grandson, the third Baronet, who succeeded his father in 1990.

== Batho baronets, of Frinton (1928) ==
- Sir Charles Albert Batho, 1st Baronet (1872–1938)
- Sir Maurice Benjamin Batho, 2nd Baronet (1910–1990)
- Sir Peter Ghislain Batho, 3rd Baronet (1939–2024)
- Sir Rupert Sebastian Ghislain Batho, 4th Baronet (born 1967)

The heir apparent is the present baronet's son Benjamin James Ghislain Batho (born 2006).

Coat of arms of Batho baronets
| Crest A dragon sejant Or gorged with a mural crown Gules and holding in the dexter claw a sword as in the arms. Escutcheon Gules on a fess Argent two castles of the first over all a sword in pale point upwards Proper. Motto Nec Parvis Sisto |
