= James Brunton =

Canadian judge

James Brunton is a judge on the Quebec Superior Court who in late 2005 ruled that no restrictions should be placed upon Karla Homolka's freedom following the completion of her jail term earlier that year. In 2006 he refused to extradite eleven residents of Eastern Townships, Quebec to Vermont in the United States to face U.S. federal charges of conspiracy to traffic and import marijuana.

Brunton received his B.A. degree from McGill University in 1972 and his law degree from the same institution in 1977. He was appointed to the Superior Court in 2003, replacing Pierrette Rayle, who went on to the Court of Appeal. After 22 years of service James Brunton retired in 2026 january 1st.
