= Richard Brunton (artist) =

British-American artist

Richard Brunton (c. 1749 – September 8, 1832) was a British-American artist most notable for his work depicting the American Revolutionary War.

== Biography ==
Brunton claimed to have been born in Birmingham, England in 1749. He was listed as an apprentice to Joseph Troughton in 1766. From a muster roll dating from May to December 1774, Brunton was listed as a soldier, a part of the grenadier company in the 38th Regiment of Foot. He arrived on July 6, 1774, in the port of Boston. However, he deserted in June 1779 from Verplanck's Point, New York. He married Polly Fullerton on October 14, 1779. In January 1783, Polly and Richard traveled to Groton, Massachusetts while Polly was pregnant. Both were later warned from the town on January 26, 1783. The couple had one son, but he died in infancy on March 5, 1783, in the town of Pepperell, where the two went after being warned from Groton. In 1795, Brunton was caught engraving counterfeit money in Enfield, Connecticut, but was released for a lack of evidence. However, he was caught once more in 1799 in Woodstock, Connecticut creating counterfeit coins, and was sentenced to serve two years of hard labor in New-Gate Prison. After his release, he was caught counterfeiting once again and received a life sentence. However, in 1811 he petitioned for his release on the grounds of illness, claiming he would return to England. However, once released he returned to Groton, Massachusetts where he would die in 1832.
