= Seymour Berry, 1st Baron Buckland =

Welsh financier and industrialist (1877–1928)

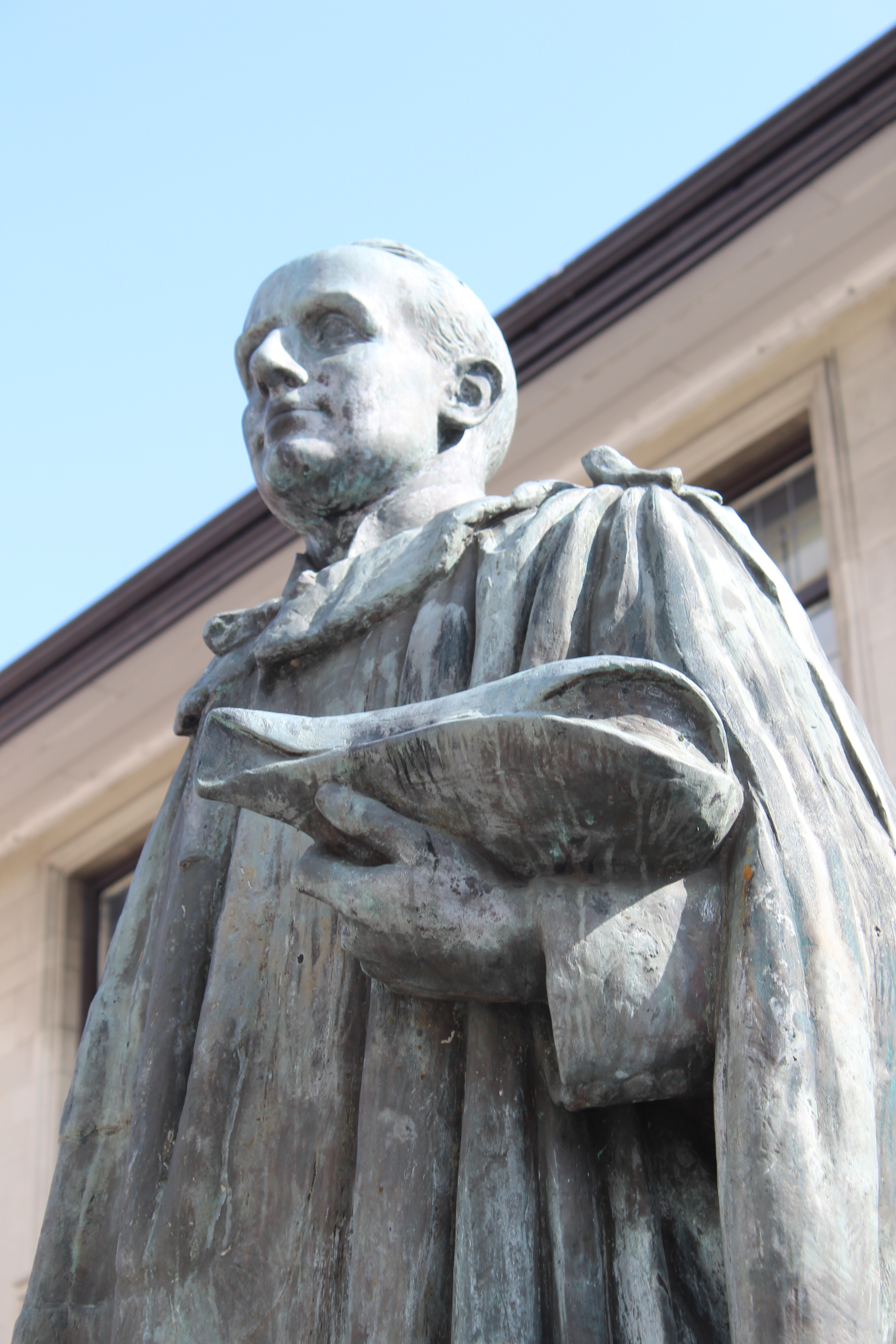
Statue of Buckland by Goscombe John, outside the Carnegie Library in Merthyr Tydfil

Henry Seymour Berry, 1st Baron Buckland (17 September 1877 – 23 May 1928), was a Welsh financier and industrialist.

== Background ==
The eldest of three sons, all born in Merthyr Tydfil to solicitor John Mathias Berry (born 2 May 1847; died 9 January 1917) and his wife Mary Ann Rowe (died 6 June 1922). He was the elder brother of newspaper magnates William Berry, 1st Viscount Camrose, and Gomer Berry, 1st Viscount Kemsley.

== Business career ==
Berry worked for his father's business before becoming a protégé of industrialist D. A. Thomas (later 1st Viscount Rhondda) in 1915. He took on more responsibility when Thomas joined the cabinet, and within three years he was a director of over 60 companies. He acquired John Lysaght Ltd with his brother William Berry, D. R. Llewellyn and Lady Rhondda and was chairman until it became part of Guest, Keen and Nettlefolds in 1920. He subsequently became chairman of GKN in 1927.

He held the office of High Sheriff of Brecknockshire in 1924 and was elevated to the peerage in the 1926 Birthday Honours as Baron Buckland, of Bwlch in the County of Brecon, on 16 July 1926. He was also appointed a Knight of Grace in the Order of St. John of Jerusalem.

== Personal life ==
He died in 1928 in Bwlch, Brecknockshire, from head injuries following a fall from a horse. He was survived by his wife, Gwladys Mary whom he married on 5 September 1907, and their five daughters: Cecily Eveline; Joan Sybil; Gwladys Eileen; Mary Lorraine; Dorothy Margaret.

== Memorial ==
A statue, by Goscombe John, was erected in his memory outside the library in Merthyr Tydfil. In 2010, plaques in memorial to his brothers were also added.

Peerage of the United Kingdom
New creation	Baron Buckland; 1926–1928	Extinct
