= William Berry, 1st Viscount Camrose =

British peer and newspaper publisher (1879–1954)

The Right Honourable The Viscount Camrose DL
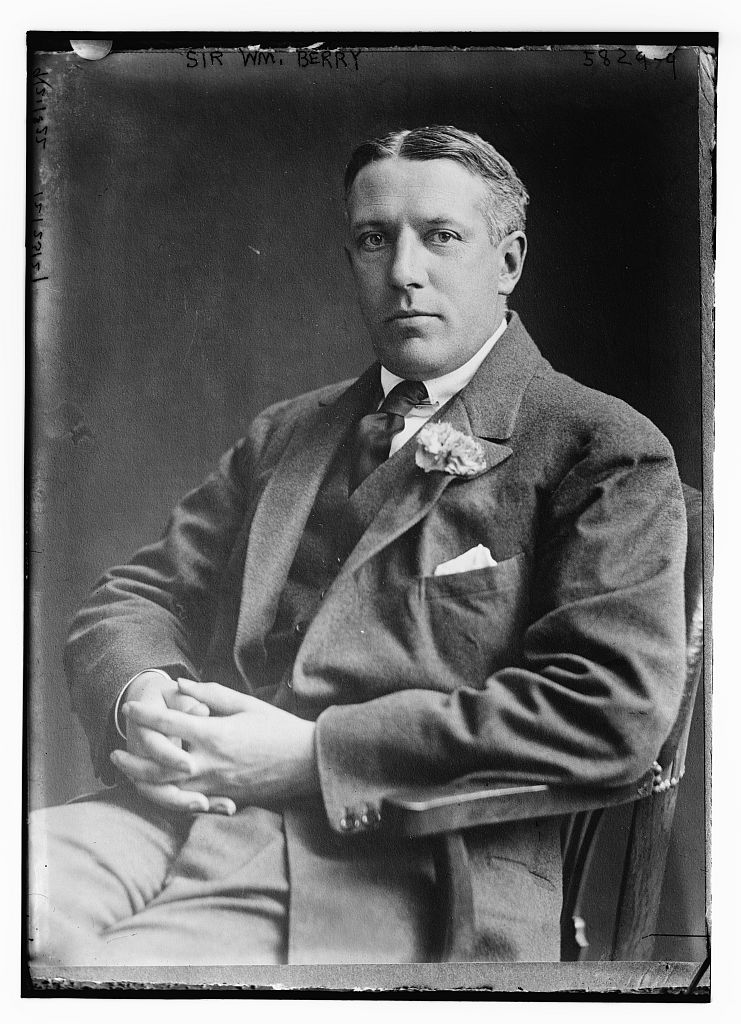
- Sir William Berry, c. 1920–1925
- Born: William Ewart Berry; 23 June 1879; Merthyr Tydfil, Wales
- Died: 15 June 1954 (aged 74)
- Occupation: Publisher
- Known for: Advertising World; The War Illustrated; Western Mail; Allied Newspapers
- Title: 1st Viscount Camrose
- Spouse: Mary Agnes Corns (m. 1905)
- Children: 8, including Seymour Berry, 2nd Viscount Camrose and Michael Berry, Baron Hartwell
- Parent(s): Mary Ann (Rowe) and John Mathias Berry
- Relatives: brothers: Seymour Berry, 1st Baron Buckland, and Gomer Berry, 1st Viscount Kemsley

William Ewart Berry, 1st Viscount Camrose, DL (23 June 1879 – 15 June 1954) was a British peer and newspaper publisher.

== Life and career ==
Berry was born in Merthyr Tydfil in Wales, the second of three sons of Mary Ann (Rowe) and John Mathias Berry. Berry started his working life as a journalist and established his own paper, Advertising World, in 1901. Berry made his fortune with the publication of the First World War magazine The War Illustrated, which at its peak had a circulation of 750,000. In partnership with his younger brother, Gomer Berry, 1st Viscount Kemsley (the elder brother was Seymour Berry, 1st Baron Buckland), he purchased The Sunday Times in 1915 and was its editor-in-chief until 1937. In 1919 the pair also purchased the Financial Times.

In 1924 the Berry brothers and Sir Edward Iliffe set up Allied Newspapers and purchased the Daily Dispatch, the Manchester Evening Chronicle, the Sunday Chronicle, the Sunday News, and the Sunday Graphic, as well as a string of other newspapers across the country. In Cardiff they merged four newspapers into the Western Mail. In 1927 they purchased The Daily Telegraph from the 2nd Harry Levy-Lawson, 1st Viscount Burnham, with William Berry becoming its editor-in-chief. In 1937 they purchased its rival, The Morning Post.

In 1926, the Berry brothers/Allied Newspapers purchased Amalgamated Press (AP), which had been started by Alfred Harmsworth, 1st Viscount Northcliffe, in 1901 (Harmsworth had died in 1922).

Berry bought out his partners in 1937 and amalgamated The Morning Post with The Daily Telegraph, with himself as chairman and editor-in-chief. His sons Seymour, the 2nd Viscount, and subsequently Michael, continued to run the newspaper until 1986; in addition, Seymour was Vice Chairman of Amalgamated Press from 1942 to 1959 (when AP was acquired by the Mirror Group).

He provided financial assistance to Sir Winston Churchill after the Second World War. He and ten other wealthy well-wishers each donated £5,000 to the Churchills, allowing them to keep their home, Chartwell, on the condition that it would be presented to the nation upon their deaths.

== Honours ==
Berry was created a baronet in the 1921 Birthday Honours. He was raised to the peerage as Baron Camrose, of Long Cross in the County of Surrey, on 19 June 1929, and advanced to Viscount Camrose, of Hackwood Park in the County of Southampton, on 20 January 1941.

== Family ==
Berry married Mary Agnes Corns in 1905. They had eight children together:

- Hon. Mary Cecilia Berry (1906 – 24 June 1996)
- (John) Seymour Berry, 2nd Viscount Camrose (12 July 1909 – 15 February 1995)
- (William) Michael Berry, Baron Hartwell, 3rd Viscount Camrose (18 May 1911 – 3 April 2001)
- Hon. Sheila Berry (1913–1992)
- Hon. Molly Patricia Berry (1915 – 31 August 1995)
- Hon. Rodney Mathias Berry (29 April 1917 – 10 March 1963)
- Lt Col. Hon. Julian Berry (24 May 1920 – 1988)
- Hon. Diana Phyllis Berry (1924 – March 1995)

Berry died in 1954 and was succeeded in the viscountcy, barony and baronetcy by his eldest son, Seymour.

Berry's great-grandson is actor Joshua Sasse.

== Arms ==
Coat of arms of William Berry, 1st Viscount Camrose
Crest A griffin sejant reguardant Sable collared Or. Escutcheon Argent three bars Gules over all a pile Ermine. Supporters On either side a wolf Proper gorged with a collar Or pendent therefrom an escutcheon Sable charged with two pens in saltire Argent. Motto Vivere Virtute (To Live in Virtue)

Peerage of the United Kingdom
New creation	Viscount Camrose; 1941–1954	Succeeded by Seymour Berry
New creation	Baron Camrose; 1929–1954	Succeeded by Seymour Berry
Baronetage of the United Kingdom
New creation	Baronet (of Hackwood Park); 1921–1954	Succeeded by Seymour Berry
