= Brunton baronets =

Baronetcy in the Baronetage of the United Kingdom

- Escutcheon of the Brunton baronets of Stratford Place
- Creation date: 1908
- Status: dormant
- Motto: Deus noster refugium et virtus, God is our refuge and strength

The Brunton baronetcy, of Stratford Place in St Marylebone, London, is a title in the Baronetage of the United Kingdom, created on 17 July 1908 for the physician Lauder Brunton. It is now considered dormant.

== Brunton baronets, of Stratford Place (1908) ==
- Sir (Thomas) Lauder Brunton, 1st Baronet (1844–1916)
- Sir (James) Stopford Lauder Brunton, 2nd Baronet (1884–1943)
- Sir (Edward Francis) Lauder Brunton, 3rd Baronet (1916–2007)
- Sir James Lauder Brunton, 4th Baronet (born 1947). His name does not appear on the Official Roll.

The heir apparent is the present holder's son Douglas Lauder Brunton (born 1968).

== Notes ==
Baronetage of the United Kingdom
Preceded by Jehangir baronets	Brunton baronets of Stratford Place; 17 July 1908	Succeeded by Cheyne baronets
