= Berry baronets =

There have been three Berry baronetcies, all in the Baronetage of the United Kingdom.

- Berry baronets of Catton, Yorkshire (1806): see Edward Berry
- Berry baronets of Hackwood Park, Hampshire (1921): see Viscount Camrose
- Berry baronets of Farnham Royal (1928): see Viscount Kemsley
