= Johnston Press =

Former multimedia company founded in Falkirk, Scotland

Johnston Press plc

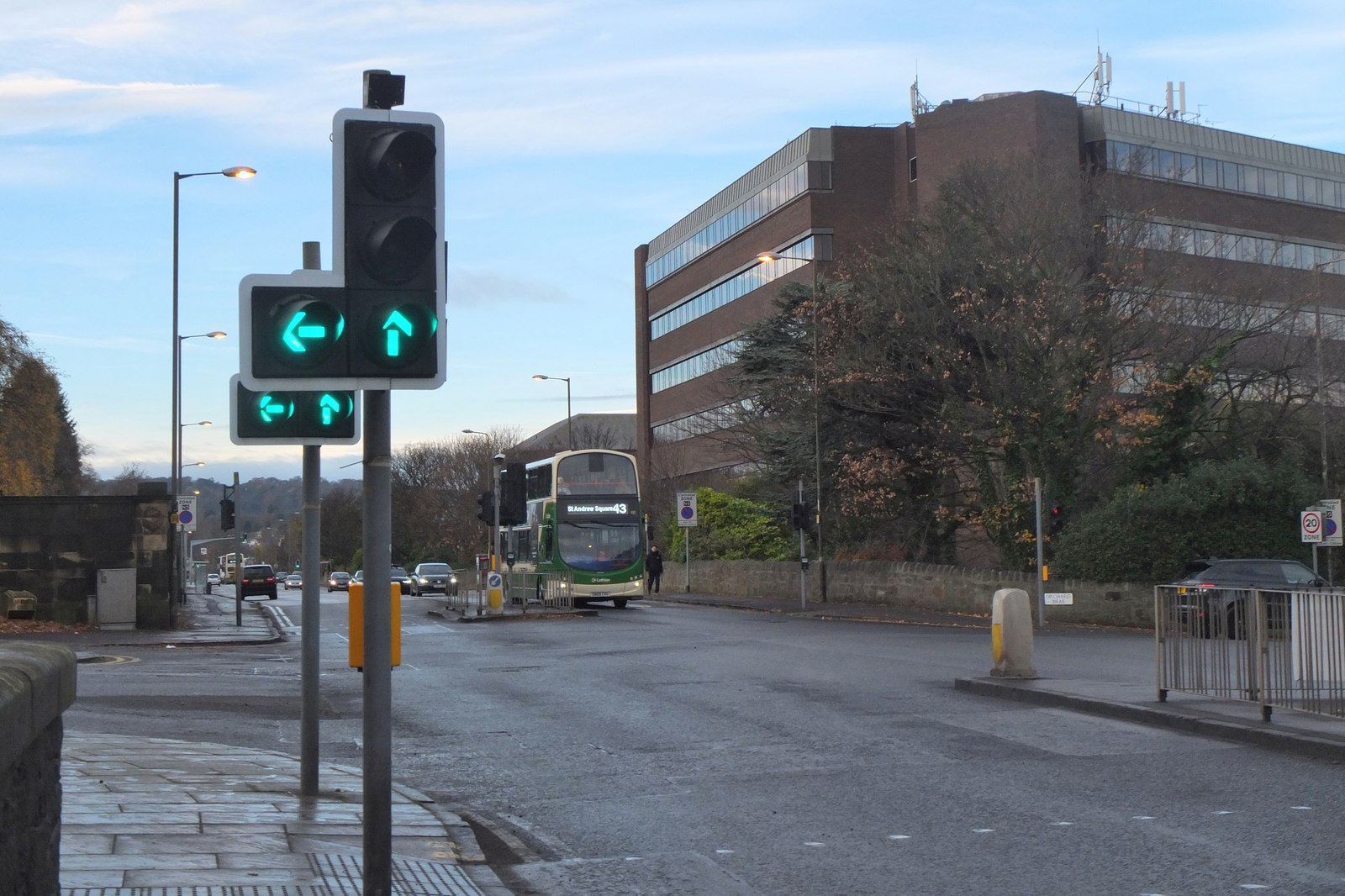
- Orchard Brae House, Edinburgh
- Type: Private
- Traded as: LSE: JPR
- Industry: Newspapers
- Founded: 1767; 259 years ago
- Defunct: 2018; 8 years ago
- Fate: Entered Administration. Assets acquired by JPIMedia
- Successor: JPIMedia
- Headquarters: Edinburgh, Scotland, UK
- Key people: David King (CEO)
- Revenue: £245.1 million (2015)
- Operating income: £1.0 million (2015)
- Net income: £11.4 million (2015)
- Parent: JPIMedia
- Website: See JPIMedia's website

Johnston Press plc was a multimedia company founded in Falkirk, Scotland, in 1767. Its flagship titles included UK-national newspaper the i, The Scotsman, the Yorkshire Post, the Falkirk Herald, and Belfast's The News Letter. The company was operating around 200 newspapers and associated websites around the United Kingdom and the Isle of Man when it went into administration and was then purchased by JPIMedia in 2018.

The Falkirk Herald was the company's first acquisition in 1846. Johnston Press's assets were transferred to JPIMedia in 2018, who continued to publish its titles.

Johnston Press announced it would place itself in administration on 16 November 2018 after it was unable to find a suitable buyer of the business to refinance £220m of debt. It was delisted from the London Stock Exchange on 19 November 2018. Johnston Press and its assets were brought under the control of JPIMedia on 17 November 2018 after a pre-packaged deal was agreed with creditors.

== History ==
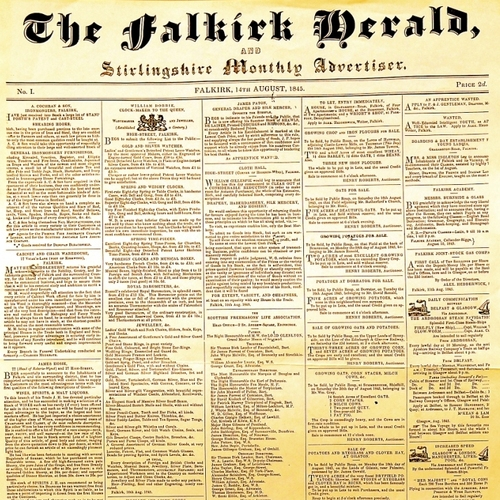
The first edition of the Falkirk Herald (1845), Johnston's first acquisition in 1846

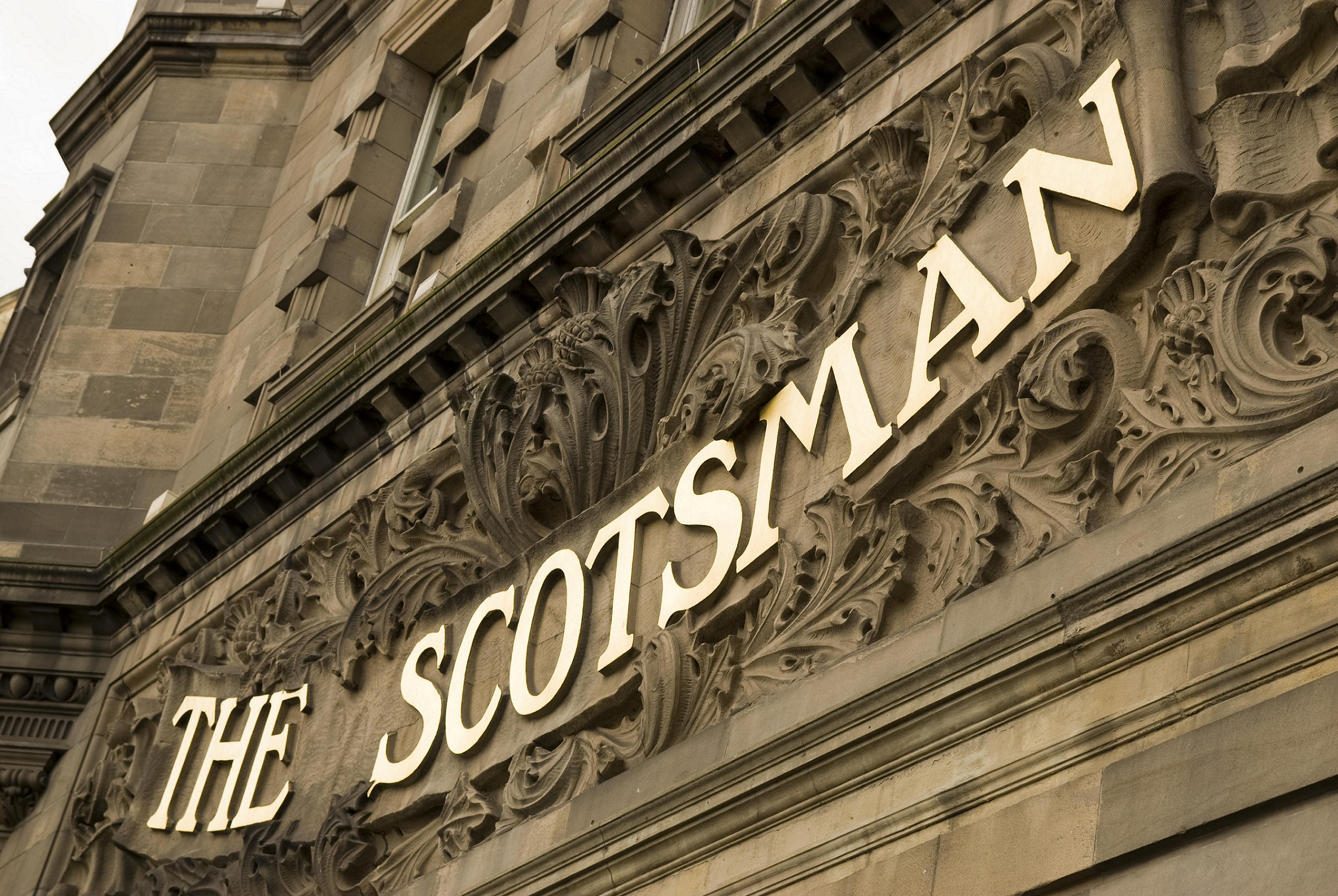
Johnston acquired one of Scotland's national titles, The Scotsman, in 2006

The Johnston family business was involved in printing from 1797, originally in Falkirk. It bought control of its first newspaper, the Falkirk Herald, in 1846. The company would remain headquartered in Falkirk for the next 150 years. The family publishing company was renamed F Johnston & Co Ltd in 1882, a title it would retain until it was floated on the London Stock Exchange as Johnston Press (LSE: JPR) in 1988.

The company's first major acquisition came in 1970, when it took control of the Fife-based publishers Strachan & Livingston. In 1978, it bought Wilfred Edmunds Ltd in Chesterfield, publisher of the Derbyshire Times and The Yorkshire Weekly Newspaper Group in Wakefield. The company bought The West Sussex County Times in 1988, The Halifax Evening Courier in 1994 and the newspaper interests of EMAP plc in 1996. Further expansion followed with Portsmouth & Sunderland Newspapers in 1999 and Regional Independent Media Holdings in 2002.

The company expanded into the Irish market in 2005 by purchasing Local Press Ltd, a company owned by 3i (£65 million), the newspaper assets of Scottish Radio Holdings, known as Score Press with forty-five titles in Scotland and Ireland (£155 million), and the Leinster Leader Group (€138.6 million).

Johnston Press acquired The Scotsman Publications in 2006, taking ownership of two of Scotland's major national broadsheet titles, The Scotsman and Scotland on Sunday, as well as two local papers, the Edinburgh Evening News and the Edinburgh Herald & Post.

In 2014, Iconic Newspapers acquired Johnston Press' titles in the Republic of Ireland. In March of that year, Johnston Press launched a digital advertising agency called 1XL, in partnership with a number of other media companies including Local World and Newsquest.

In February 2016, the company announced it was buying i newspaper for £24m. The deal to buy i was completed on 10 April 2016, giving Johnston Press a daily print circulation of over 600,000 newspapers and an audience online and in print of almost 32 million people.

In July 2016 Johnston Press sold off its three titles on the Isle of Man — the Isle of Man Examiner, the Isle of Man Courier and the Manx Independent — to Tindle Newspapers in a deal worth £4.25m. In January 2017 Johnston sold off a further 13 titles covering the East Midlands and East Anglia (including the Stamford Mercury) to Iliffe Media for £17m. The same month, the company also won a contract from Associated Newspapers (ANL) to print the Monday-to-Saturday issues of the Daily Mail newspaper at Johnston's Portsmouth Web facility in Hampshire, following the closure of ANL's printing site at Didcot.

=== Administration ===
In October 2018, with debts of around £200m and a market capitalisation of £3m, the company announced that it had put itself up for sale. On 16 November 2018, the group announced it was filing for administration, intending to then sell the assets to its lenders. Johnson Press in a statement added there was no longer any value in its shares, in a major blow to Christen Ager-Hanssen, the chief executive of Custos Group, which was the largest shareholder at 25 percent. The company agreed a pre-packaged administration whereby Johnston Press's businesses and assets would be sold to a group of companies controlled by its creditors. Those included GoldenTree Asset Management, the largest creditor with about £70m of bonds.

=== Takeover by creditors ===
On 17 November 2018, a spokesperson for Johnston Press announced that all its titles had been transferred to the control of JPIMedia, a special purpose vehicle (SPV), owned by the creditors. Under the terms of the pre-packaged deal, ownership passed to a consortium of four lenders, CarVal, Fidelity, Benefit Street Partners and Goldentree Asset Management – who reduced its debts to £85 million and injected £35 million investment. This however was subject to criticism by Johnston Press's largest shareholder, described as a "blatant pre-planned corporate theft by bondholders", and was raised in Parliament.

== Operations ==
=== Newspapers in Great Britain ===
The following is a partial list of British newspapers once owned by the company:

- Arbroath Herald
- Banbury Guardian
- Batley & Birstall News
- Belper News
- Bellshill Speaker
- Berwick Advertiser
- Biggleswade Chronicle
- Blackpool Gazette
- Bognor Regis Observer
- Bridlington Free Press
- Brighton & Hove Independent
- Buckingham Advertiser
- Bucks Herald
- Burnley Express
- Buxton Advertiser
- Carrick Gazette
- Chichester Observer
- Chorley Guardian
- Crawley Observer
- Cumbernauld News
- Daventry Express
- Dewsbury Reporter
- Diss Express
- Dinnington Guardian
- Doncaster Free Press
- Edinburgh Evening News
- Edinburgh Herald and Post
- Eastbourne Herald
- East Grinstead Gazette
- Ellon Times
- Falkirk Herald
- Fife Free Press
- Fife Herald & Post
- Fife Leader
- Filey Mercury
- Fleetwood Weekly News
- Galloway Gazette
- Gainsborough Standard
- Glasgow South and Eastwood Extra
- Green Un (Sheffield)
- Halifax Courier
- Harborough Mail
- Hartlepool Mail
- Harrogate Advertiser
- Hemel Hempstead Gazette
- Hemsworth and South Elmsall Express
- Horncastle News
- The i
- Kilsyth Chronicle
- Lanark Gazette
- Lancashire Evening Post
- Lancaster Guardian
- Lancaster Visitor
- Lancing Herald
- Leyland Guardian
- Leamington Courier
- Leighton Buzzard Observer
- Littlehampton Gazette
- Louth Leader
- Luton News
- Lynn News
- Lytham St Annes Express
- Market Rasen Mail
- Malton & Pickering Mercury
- Matlock Mercury
- Mansfield Chad
- Mid Sussex Times
- Mirfield Reporter
- Milngavie and Bearsden Herald
- Milton Keynes Citizen
- Montrose Review
- Morecambe Visitor
- Morpeth Herald
- Motherwell Times
- News Guardian
- News Post Leader
- The News (Portsmouth)
- Northamptonshire Evening Telegraph
- Northampton Chronicle & Echo
- Northumberland Gazette
- Paisley and Renfrewshire Extra (now defunct)
- Perth Herald & Post
- Peterborough Evening Telegraph
- Pocklington Post
- Retford Guardian
- Ripon Gazette
- Rugby Advertiser
- Scarborough News
- Scotland on Sunday
- The Scotsman
- Selby Times
- Sheffield Star
- Sheffield Telegraph
- Shields Gazette
- Shoreham Herald
- Skegness Standard
- Spilsby Standard
- Stornoway Gazette
- Sunderland Echo
- Sussex Express
- Times & Citizen (Bedford)
- Todmorden News
- The Visitor (Morecambe, Lancs)
- Westend Extra (Glasgow)
- West Lothian Herald & Post
- West Sussex County Times
- West Sussex Gazette
- West Sussex Citizen
- Wetherby News
- Whitby Gazette
- Wigan Post
- Worksop Guardian
- Worthing Herald
- Yorkshire Evening Post
- Yorkshire Post

=== Newspapers in Ireland ===
JPIMedia publishes a total of 22 titles in Northern Ireland through two holding companies, JPIMedia NI and Derry Journal Newspapers. The geographic readership of some titles extends across the Irish border into the Republic of Ireland, such as the Derry Journal which also covers County Donegal. Former JPIMedia titles published in the Republic of Ireland now belong to Iconic Newspapers.

==== Johnston Publishing (NI) ====
===== Daily =====
- The News Letter

===== Local (NI) =====
- Ballymena Times
- Ballymoney and Moyle Times
- Carrick Times (Carrickfergus)
- Coleraine Times
- Dromore Leader
- Larne Times
- Londonderry Sentinel
- Lurgan Mail
- Mid Ulster Mail
- Portadown Times
- Newtownabbey Times
- Tyrone Times
- Ulster Star

===== Free titles (NI) =====
- Banbridge & District Weekender
- Belfast News
- Craigavon Echo
- East Antrim Advertiser
- Lisburn Echo
- Mid Ulster Echo
- North West Echo

==== Derry Journal newspapers ====
===== Local (Derry Journal) =====
- Derry Journal
- Sunday Journal

===== Free titles (Derry Journal) =====
- City News
- Foyle News
