= National World =

British news publishing company

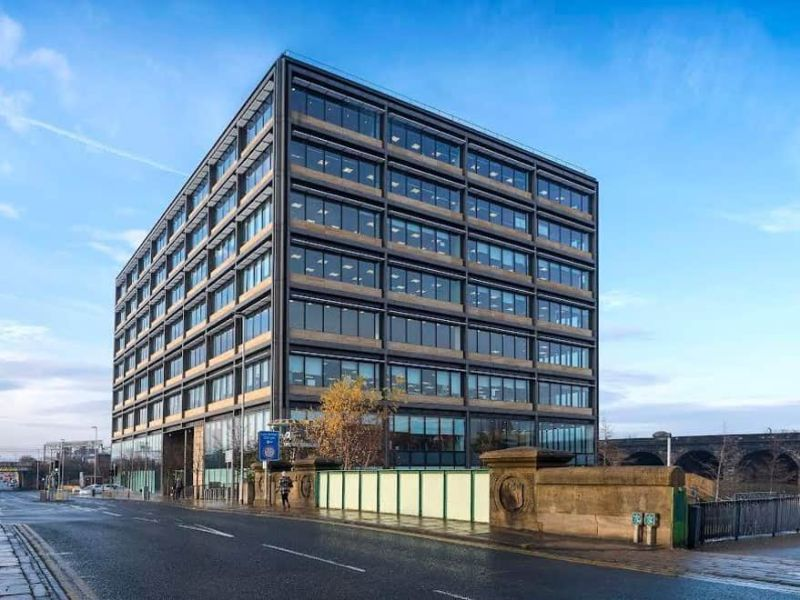
- Leeds head office of National World
- Formerly: Carno Capital Limited (May–July 2019); National World Limited (30 July 2019)
- Type: Public company
- Industry: Digital media
- Founded: 29 May 2019; 7 years ago
- Headquarters: Leeds, England
- Area served: Worldwide
- Key people: Malcolm Denmark
- Revenue: £84.1M (2022)
- Operating income: £9.7M (2022)
- Parent: Media Concierge
- Subsidiaries: Full list
- Website: nationalworldplc.com

National World (NW) is a British multimedia company based in Leeds, England.

Founded and listed on the London Stock Exchange (LSE) in September 2019 as a media takeover vehicle, it acquired JPIMedia for £10.2 million two years later. In April 2022, JPIMedia was rebranded to National World.

Since purchasing JPIMedia, NW has launched sixteen new titles and made a further seven acquisitions, notably Insider Media. With The Scotsman, The Yorkshire Post, and Belfast's The News Letter among its flagship titles, it operates over 100 newspapers and websites around the United Kingdom.

The company reported 2022 revenues of £84.1M and adjusted EBITDA of £9.7M. In May 2025, Media Concierge, owner of Iconic Newspapers, acquired National World for £65.1 million.

== Acquisition by Media Concierge ==
In May 2025, National World plc was acquired by Media Concierge (MC), a London-based media company led by its CEO Malcolm Denmark. Valued at £65.1 million, the transaction involved Media Concierge buying the remaining 72.2% of shares it did not already own for 23p per share.

On May 27, five days after being approved by the High Court in London, the transaction became effective. Subsequently, NW was delisted from the LSE, transitioning into a privately owned company belonging to a subsidiary of MC, Neo Media Publishing.

The acquisition positions Media Concierge as the third-largest regional news publisher in the UK, expanding its portfolio to include over 100 regional titles such as The Scotsman, Yorkshire Post, and The News Letter.

== Acquisitions ==
=== JPI Media ===
On 31 December 2020, it was announced that JPIMedia Publishing Ltd (formerly Johnston Press) and its subsidiaries were being sold to National World PLC on 2 January 2021. The new company was set up by the media executive David Montgomery.

On 29 April 2022, JPIMedia Publishing Ltd rebranded to National World Publishing Ltd, otherwise known as National World.

=== Midland News Association ===
In September 2023, it was announced that the Graham family-owned Claverley Group had sold its subsidiary Midland News Association to National World PLC. The £11m sale included the regional daily newspapers Shropshire Star and Express & Star, and a number of weekly titles, along with Press Computer Systems, which supplies publishing platforms for both MNA and other major publishers including Newsquest and DC Thomson. The sale marked Claverley Group's exit from regional newspaper publishing.

== Operations ==
Since the acquisition of JPI Media, National World Plc has made further launches and acquisitions.

In March 2021, nationalworld.com was launched as a national news website with an editorial team across the UK. This was followed by the launch of city websites in Manchester, Liverpool, Newcastle, Glasgow, London, Birmingham and Bristol. Further sites were launched for Northern Ireland, Sussex, Lincolnshire and Warwickshire.

Subsequent launches were made in 2023 into Nottingham and Derby, and further national sites were launched, peopleworld.co.uk and 3addedminutes.com. National World also acquired the assets of football website publisher Scoopdragon and video content aggregator Newschain, and news titles such as Newry Reporter, Farm Week and Banbridge Chronicle.

On 2 May 2023 the company announced the acquisitions of business media provider Insider Media as well as Yorkshire publisher the Rotherham Advertiser.

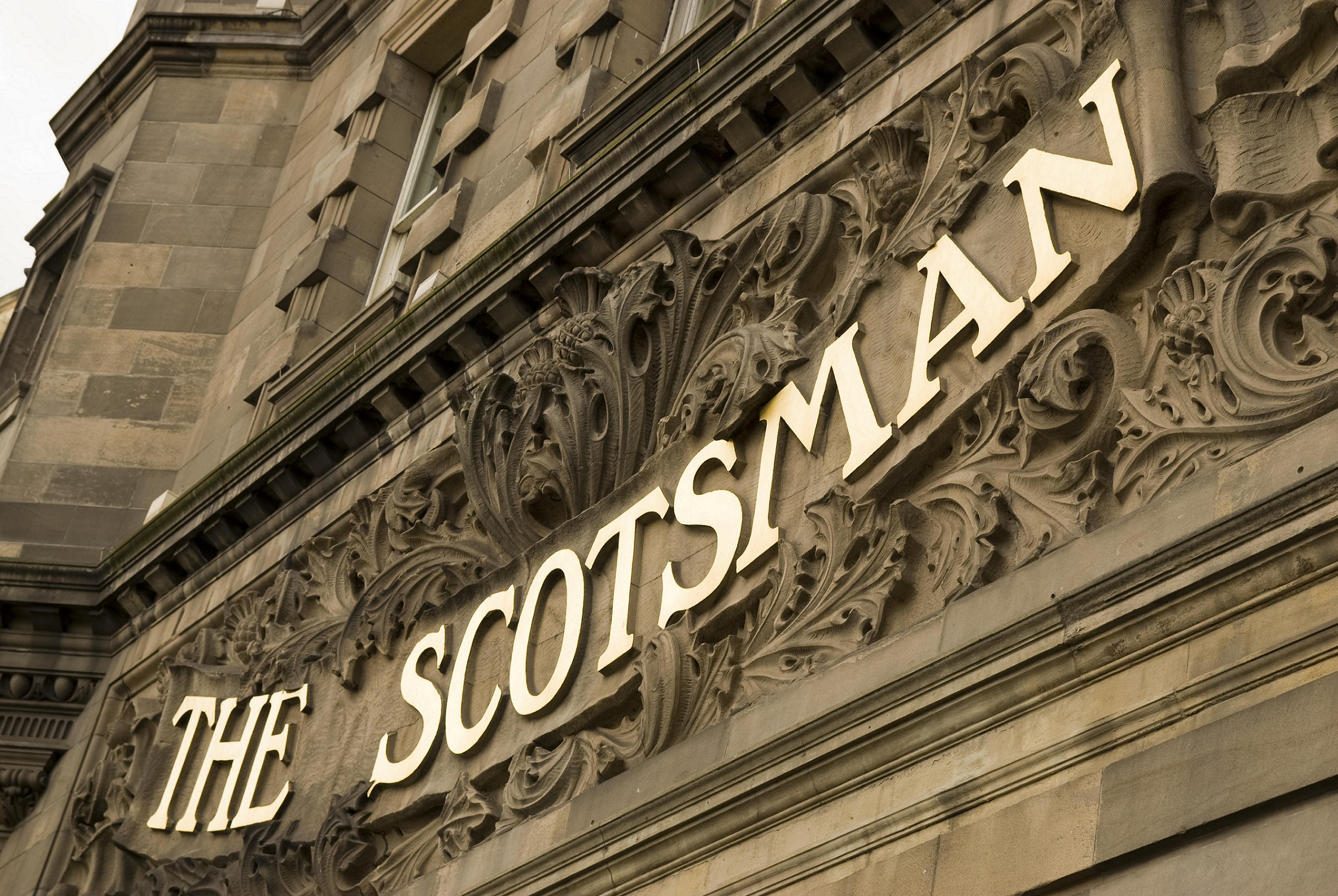
NationalWorld owns one of Scotland's national titles, The Scotsman

=== Media brands in Great Britain ===
The following is a partial list of British websites, magazines and newspapers owned by the company:

- Arbroath Herald
- Banbury Guardian
- Batley & Birstall News
- Bellshill Speaker
- Berwick Advertiser
- Biggleswade Chronicle
- BirminghamWorld
- Blackpool Gazette
- Bognor Regis Observer
- Boston Standard
- The Brechiner
- Bridlington Free Press
- Brighton & Hove Independent
- Bristol World
- Buckingham Advertiser
- Bucks Herald
- Burnley Express
- Buxton Advertiser
- Carrick Gazette
- Chichester Observer
- Chorley Guardian
- Crawley Observer
- Cumbernauld News
- Daventry Express
- Dearne Valley Weekender
- Derbyshire Times
- Derby World
- Dewsbury Reporter
- Diss Express
- Dinnington Guardian
- Doncaster Free Press
- Edinburgh Evening News
- Edinburgh Herald and Post
- Eastbourne Herald
- East Grinstead Gazette
- Ellon Times
- Farming Life
- Falkirk Herald
- Fife Free Press
- Fife Herald & Post
- Fife Leader
- Filey Mercury
- Fleetwood Weekly News
- Forfar Dispatch
- Galloway Gazette
- Gainsborough Standard
- Glasgow South and Eastwood Extra
- GlasgowWorld
- Green Un (Sheffield)
- Halifax Courier
- Hastings Observer
- Harborough Mail
- Hartlepool Mail
- Harrogate Advertiser
- Hemel Hempstead Gazette
- Hemsworth and South Elmsall Express
- Horncastle News
- Kilsyth Chronicle
- Kirriemuir Herald
- Lanark Gazette
- Lancashire Evening Post
- Lancaster Guardian
- Lancaster Visitor
- Lancing Herald
- Leyland Guardian
- Leamington Courier
- Leighton Buzzard Observer
- Littlehampton Gazette
- LincolnshireWorld
- LiverpoolWorld
- LondonWorld
- Louth Leader
- Luton News
- Lytham St Annes Express
- Market Rasen Mail
- Malton & Pickering Mercury
- ManchesterWorld
- Mansfield Chad
- Mid Sussex Times
- Midlands Business Insider
- Mirfield Reporter
- Milngavie and Bearsden Herald
- Milton Keynes Citizen
- Montrose Review
- Morpeth Herald
- Motherwell Times
- NationalWorld.com
- NewcastleWorld
- News Guardian
- News Post Leader
- The News (Portsmouth)
- North East Business Insider
- North West Business Insider
- Northern Ireland World
- Northamptonshire Evening Telegraph
- Northampton Chronicle & Echo
- Northumberland Gazette
- NottinghamWorld
- Paisley and Renfrewshire Extra (now defunct)
- Perth Herald & Post
- People World
- Peterborough Evening Telegraph
- Pocklington Post
- Retford Guardian
- Ripon Gazette
- Rotherham Advertiser
- Rugby Advertiser
- Scarborough News
- Scotland on Sunday
- The Scotsman
- Sheffield Star
- Sheffield Telegraph
- Shields Gazette
- Shoreham Herald
- Shots! (Freeview streaming channel and website)
- Skegness Standard
- Sleaford Standard
- Southern Reporter
- South East Business Insider
- South West Business Insider
- Spilsby Standard
- Stornoway Gazette
- Sunderland Echo
- Sussex Express
- Sussex World
- Times & Citizen (Bedford)
- Todmorden News
- The Visitor (Morecambe, Lancs)
- Wales Business Insider
- Westend Extra (Glasgow)
- West Lothian Herald & Post
- West Sussex County Times
- West Sussex Gazette
- Wetherby News
- Whitby Gazette
- Wigan Evening Post
- Worksop Guardian
- Worthing Herald
- Yorkshire Evening Post
- Yorkshire Post
- Yorkshire Business Insider
- 3AddedMinutes

=== Newspapers in Northern Ireland ===
National World Publishing Ltd publishes a total of 22 titles in Northern Ireland through two holding companies, JPIMedia NI and Derry Journal Newspapers. The geographic readership of some titles extends across the Irish border into the Republic of Ireland, such as the Derry Journal which also covers County Donegal. Former JPIMedia titles published in the Republic of Ireland now belong to Iconic Newspapers.

==== Johnston Publishing (NI) ====
===== Daily =====
- The News Letter

===== Local (NI) =====
- Ballymena Times
- Ballymoney and Moyle Times
- Banbridge Chronicle
- Carrick Times (Carrickfergus)
- Coleraine Times
- Dromore Leader
- Larne Times
- Londonderry Sentinel
- Lurgan Mail
- Mid Ulster Mail
- Portadown Times
- Newtownabbey Times
- Tyrone Times
- Ulster Star
- The Newry Reporter

===== Free titles (NI) =====
- Banbridge & District Weekender
- Belfast News
- Craigavon Echo
- East Antrim Advertiser
- Lisburn Echo
- Mid Ulster Echo
- North West Echo

==== Derry Journal newspapers ====
===== Local (Derry Journal) =====
- Derry Journal
- Sunday Journal

===== Free titles (Derry Journal) =====
- City News
- Foyle News

== Shots! ==
On 7 August 2023 National World launched Shots!, a website devoted to football chat, true crime shows and real life stories. National World also acquired a streaming slot for Shots! on Freeview channel 276, where it runs 24 hours a day and features shows such as The Heritage Chart Show with Mike Read, Walks Around Britain and Exceptional Homes, along with reports such as I Was in Byker Grove.
