= Newspapers of Yorkshire =

The newspapers of Yorkshire have a long history, stretching back to the 18th century. Regional newspapers have enjoyed varying fortunes, reflected in the large number of now-defunct papers from Yorkshire.

== Existing newspapers ==
=== Daily newspapers ===
- Bradford Telegraph & Argus
- Huddersfield Daily Examiner
- Halifax Courier
- Hull Daily Mail
- Sheffield Star (Sheffield and South Yorkshire)
- The Press (York) (York and North Yorkshire)
- Yorkshire Evening Post (Leeds and West Yorkshire)
- Yorkshire Post

=== Weekly newspapers ===
- Barnsley Chronicle
- Bridlington Free Press
- Craven Herald & Pioneer
- Doncaster Free Press
- Easingwold Advertiser
- Harrogate Advertiser
- Keighley News
- Knaresborough Post
- Nidderdale Herald
- Pocklington Post
- Ripon Gazette
- Rotherham Advertiser
- Scarborough News
- Sheffield Telegraph
- Wetherby News
- Wharfedale & Airedale Observer
- Whitby Gazette

=== Monthly newspapers ===
- The City Talking
- The Yorkshire Reporter

=== Online-only newspapers ===
- The Yorkshire Times

== Defunct newspapers ==
- Bradford Star (1981–2000)
- Harrogate Herald (1847–1957), pub. Robert Ackrill.
- Hull Portfolio, radical newspaper of James Acland, founded c.1831.
- The Hull Packet and East Riding Times / The Hull Packet Humber Mercury or Yorkshire and Lincolnshire Advertiser / Yorkshire Advertiser
- Leeds Intelligencer
- Leeds Mercury
- Thirsk and District News
- York and District Advertiser
- York Chronicle and General Advertiser
- York Chronicle
- York Citizen
- York Comet
- York Co-operative Citizen
- York Courant
- York Daily Labour News
- York Express
- York Free Press Farmers Friend and Freemans Journal
- York Gazetteer
- York Gazette (20,000th issue on 15 May 1915)
- York Herald (newspaper)
- York Journal
- York Journal or Weekly Advertiser
- York Miscellany, contributed to by John Baines (mathematician)
- York Mercury
- York News
- York Pioneer
- York Sentinel
- York Star
- York Times
- York Weekly Mail
- Yorkshire Chronicle
- Yorkshire Express
- Yorkshire Gazette (1740–1752)
- Yorkshire Independent
- Yorkshire Observer
- Yorkshireman

== See also ==
- List of newspapers in the United Kingdom
- History of British newspapers
