= Buchan Observer =

The Buchan Observer is a local weekly newspaper based in Peterhead which serves Peterhead and surrounding Buchan. Known locally as The Buchanie, the Observer is renowned for its coverage of the town's football club, Peterhead F.C. The newspaper also has a comprehensive farming and fishing section.

It has three sister newspapers, the Inverurie Herald, Fraserburgh Herald and Ellon Times.

The Observer was established by John McArthur and Sir Hugh Reid in 1863.

The newspaper's ownership was transferred between Archant and Johnston Press in 2007. After Johnston Press went into administration in 2018, JPIMedia took ownership of its assets.
