= John McLellan (journalist) =

Scottish journalist (born 1962)

John McLellan (born February 1962) is a Scottish newspaper journalist, former editor of The Scotsman (2009–2012), Scottish Conservative Party media chief (2012–2013) and was a Conservative City of Edinburgh councillor (2017-2022).

== Education ==
McLellan was educated at Hutchesons' Grammar School (1974–1979) and studied BA English & media studies (1980–1983) at University of Stirling and journalism (NCTJ) at Preston Polytechnic (1983–1984).

== Career ==
McLellan was sports editor of the North-West Evening Mail and Assistant Editor of The Journal, Newcastle, before joining The Scotsman Publications in 1993 and had two spells editing the Edinburgh Evening News (1997–2002 and 2004–2009) and also edited Scotland on Sunday (2002–2004).

Johnston Press appointed McLellan as editor of The Scotsman on 20 February 2009 following the departure of Mike Gilson, and in May 2009 appointed editor-in-chief of The Scotsman Publications.

He gave evidence to the Leveson Inquiry on 18 January 2012.

McLellan was dismissed by Johnston Press on 12 April 2012 as editor of The Scotsman in a management restructuring process which involved the scrapping of the editor-in-chief role with the editors of each title reporting directly to the managing director of the Scottish Publishing Unit Andrew Richardson. He was replaced by Ian Stewart (journalist), who remained editor of its sister title Scotland on Sunday. However, McLellan has continued to write a political opinion column for The Scotsman, and also writes for The Herald.

On 23 June 2012 McLellan was appointed director of communications of the Scottish Conservatives. Former Tory spin doctor Ramsay Jones was suspended during the previous year's party leadership elections. McLellan advised Scottish Tory leader Ruth Davidson on communications strategy, direction and content.

On 28 June 2013 the Scottish Conservatives announced that McLellan had resigned his post as the party's communications director and would take up the role of director of the Scottish Newspaper Society in September.

In the May 2017 Scottish local government elections McLellan was elected to the City of Edinburgh Council as a Conservative councillor, one of four councillors for the Craigentinny & Duddingston Ward.

In May 2022 McLellan did not stand for re-election to the City of Edinburgh Council.

== Other ==
He was a member of the Press Complaints Commission (2008-2012), the Defence, Press and Broadcasting Advisory Committee (2006–12) and was twice chair of the Scottish Newspaper Society's editors' committee.

He was appointed honorary professor at the University of Stirling in 2012 in a teaching and advisory role, but retired from his staff role in November 2025 and was subsequently confirmed as professor emeritus.

== See also ==
- Michael Crow (journalist), Director of Strategy and Communications for the Scottish Conservative Party, 2009–2010
