= Mid Sussex =

Mid Sussex is an area in the central part of Sussex. It may refer to:

- Mid Sussex District, a local government district in West Sussex
- Mid Sussex (UK Parliament constituency)
- Mid Sussex Football League
- Mid Sussex Times, a local newspaper
- Arun Valley line, also called the Mid Sussex line, a rail line in West Sussex
- More Radio Mid-Sussex, a local radio station
- Brighton & Mid-Sussex, a proposed local government district in the Redcliffe-Maud Report
