= Thomas Annan =

Scottish photographer (1829–1887)

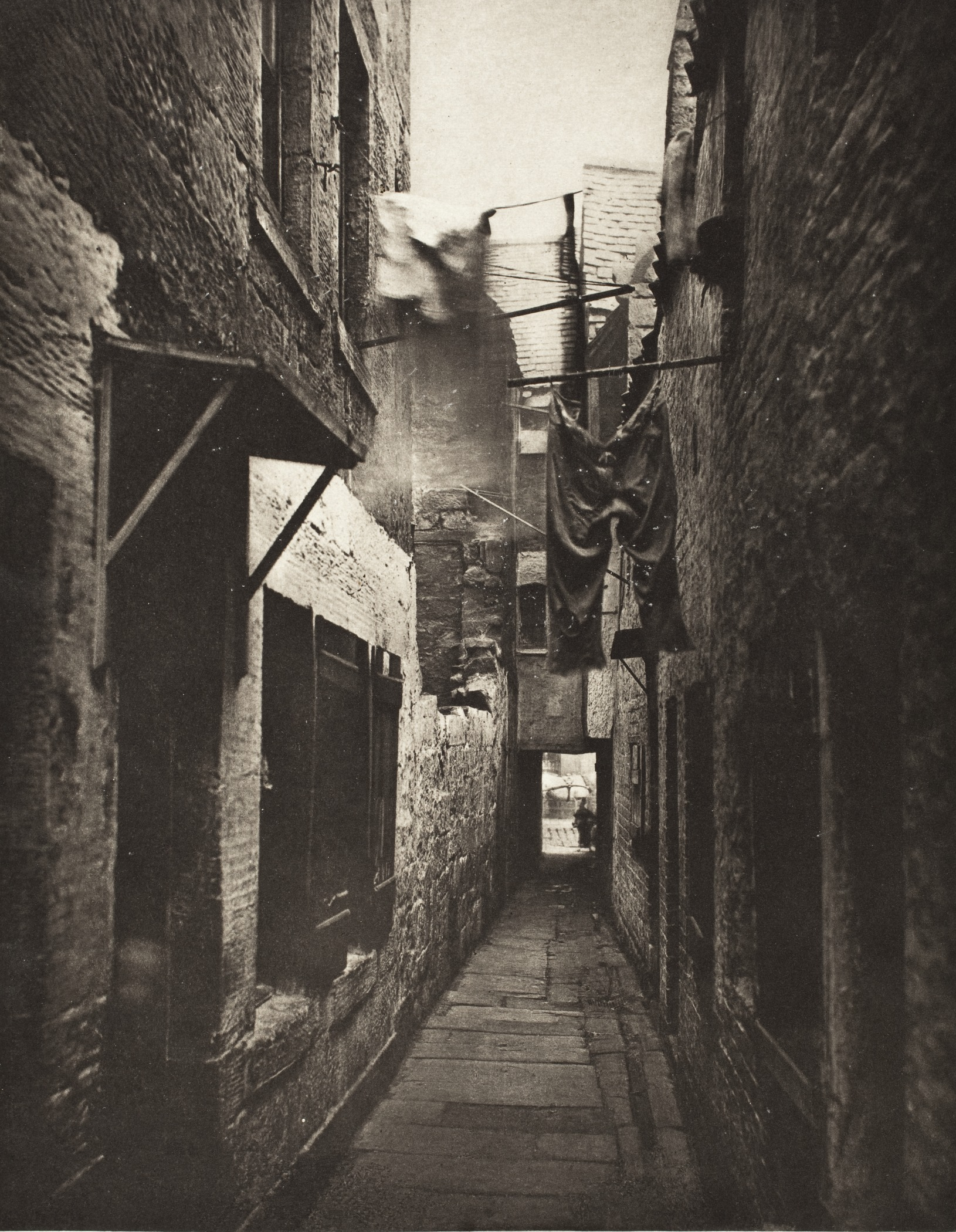
Back-alley in Glasgow, 1871

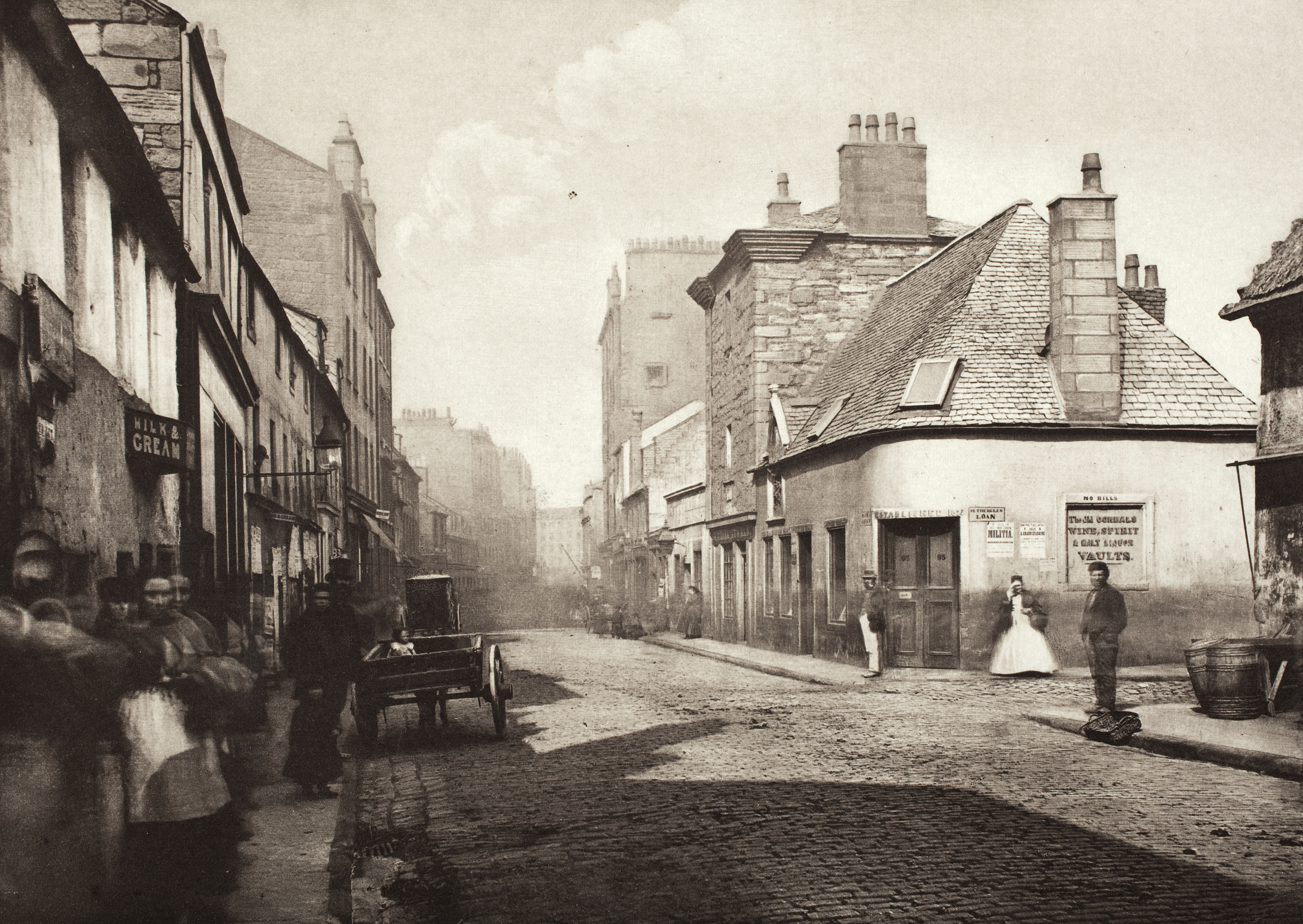
Main Street, Gorbals, looking north, 1868

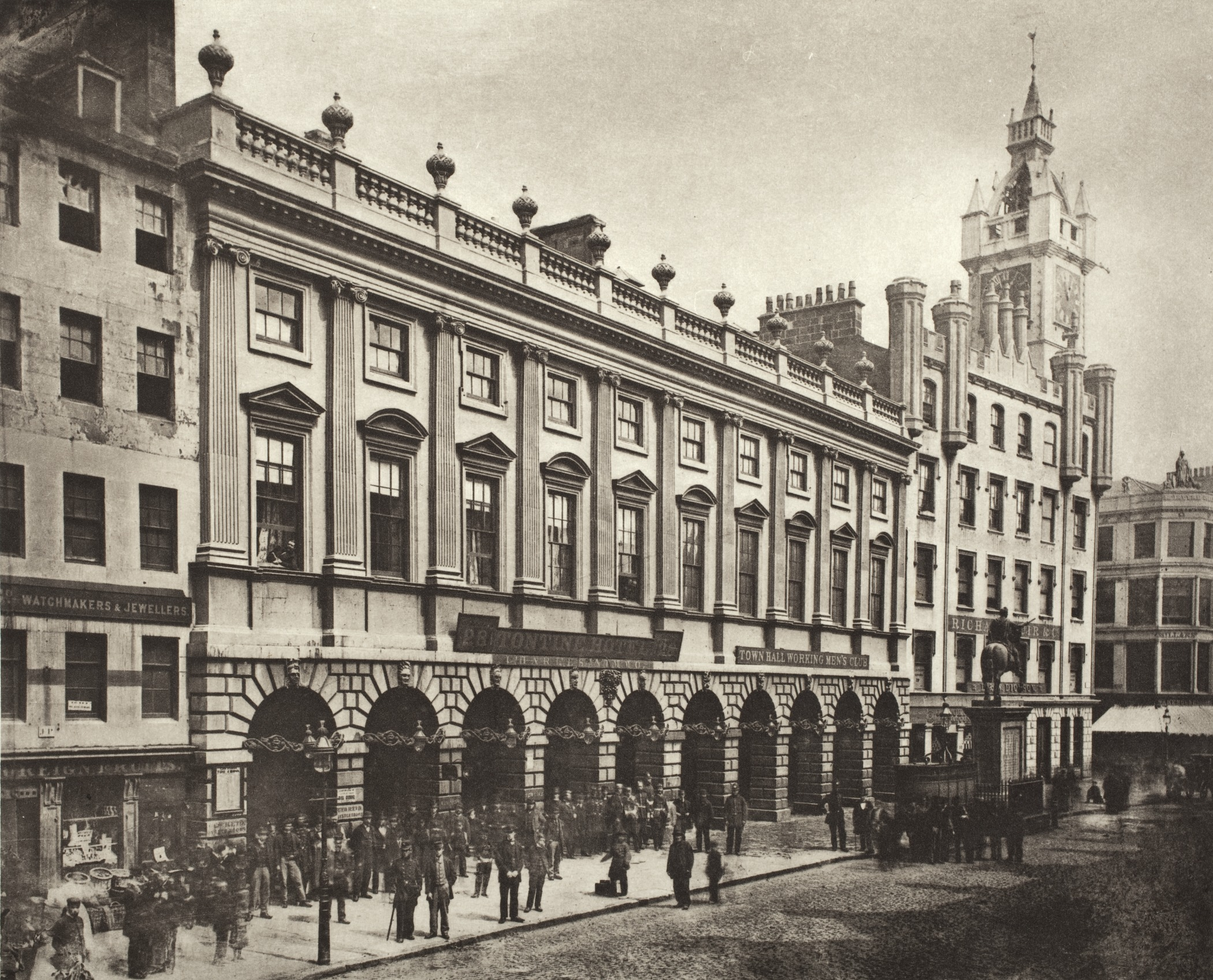
Facade of the Tontine Hotel on the Gallowgate in Glasgow; from Photographs of streets, closes &c., Taken 1868–1871 Glasgow

Thomas Annan (1829–1887) was a Scottish photographer, notable for being the first to photographically record the bad housing conditions of the poor.

== Biography ==
Born in Dairsie, Fife, Thomas Annan was one of seven children of John Annan, a flax spinner.

=== Career ===
After his initial apprenticeship as a lithographic writer and engraver at the Fife Herald in Cupar, Annan moved to Glasgow in 1849 and worked as a lithographer and engraver for Joseph Swan until 1855. He set up business with George Berwick at 40 Woodlands Road, Glasgow; Annan and Berwick were listed in the 1855–56 Glasgow post office directory as calotypists, practitioners of an early form of photography. In 1855, probably on commission by engineer Robert Napier, Annan photographed the ship RMS Persia while it was under construction on the Clyde. This photograph was part of a group of images sent to Glasgow's first major photographic exhibition, organised in September 1855 by the British Association for the Advancement of Science.

In 1857, after dissolving his partnership with Berwick, Annan established himself in a photography studio at 116 Sauchiehall Street. In 1859, the business moved to 200 Hope Street and in 1863, Annan was also able to establish a printing works in Hamilton. At first, Annan was largely interested in architectural photography, and later became interested in portraits, as well as photographing artworks and maps. In 1866, Annan began photographing slum areas of Glasgow. These images were used by Glasgow City Improvement Trust to document the overcrowded, unhygienic conditions ahead of extensive redevelopments. It was this series of photographs, created between 1868 and 1871, entitled Old Closes and Streets of Glasgow, that ensured Annan's place in photographic history.

In 1869, Annan purchased the contents of Rock House, which belonged to painter and photographer David Octavius Hill, and which included many of Hill's photographs and negatives. These were eventually exhibited by Thomas' son, James Craig Annan, and reproduced in photogravure in Alfred Stieglitz's journal Camera Work.

Annan's photographs of the Loch Katrine Waterworks were praised in the British Journal of Photography: "The views by Mr. Annan could scarcely fail to be attractive, for in a country so beautiful a clever artist is bound to produce results in keeping with the nature of the subject, and this Mr. Annan has done." Indeed, Annan's work was often praised not only for its aesthetics, but also for its technical virtuosity. Twenty years later, Annan's studio would be singled out by Baden Pritchard for its accomplishments in carbon printing and "beautiful pictures of exteriors and interiors of Scotch strongholds."

By 1880, Annan had set up the firm of T & R Annan with his son, Robert, at 153 Sauchiehall Street in Glasgow, which delt in fine art and photographic prints.

In 1883, Thomas purchased the British rights to the photogravure process from Karel Klíč in Vienna, after visiting the city with his son James. James continued in his father's profession, becoming associated with art photography of the later nineteenth-century. His notable work in photogravure earned him a Royal Warrant as one of the 'Photographers and Photographic Engravers to Her Majesty in Glasgow'.

=== Death and legacy ===
Thomas Annan died on 14 December 1887 at his home in Lenzie. The cause of death was suicide, following a month-long period of "mental aberration".

The family business survives to the present day in the form of the Annan Fine Art Gallery, located on Woodlands Road in the West End of Glasgow.

A selection of prints from the Glasgow Improvements Act of 1868 series were displayed in the Scottish National Portrait Gallery from 2011 to 2012. In 2017, the Getty Museum curated an exhibition entitled "Thomas Annan: Photographer of Glasgow," which was the first exhibition to survey Annan's career and legacy as photographer and printer.

In June 2021, a set of Annan's Old Closes and Streets was sold at auction by Bonhams; the set was purchased for £1,678 by unnamed buyer.

== Works ==
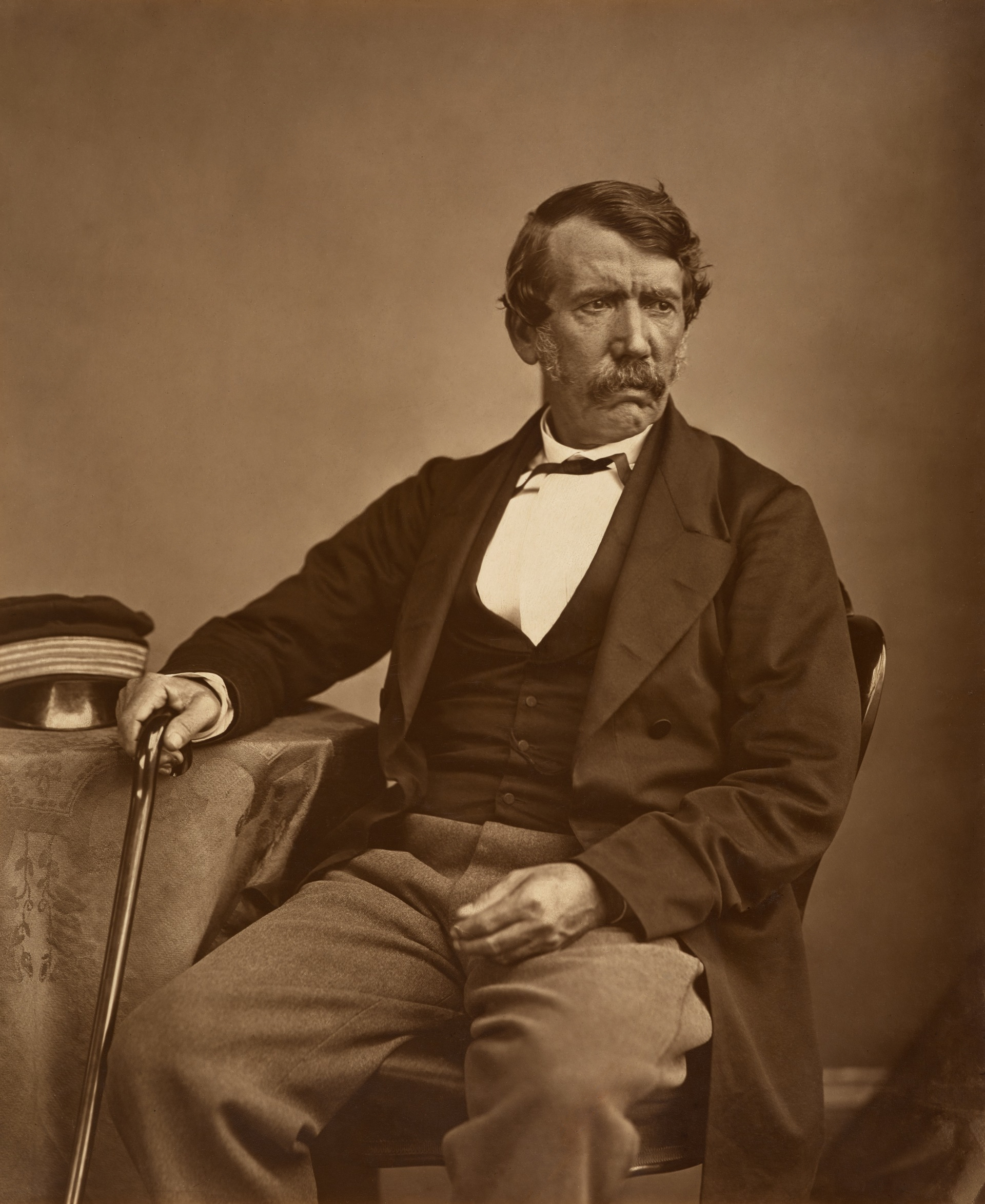
1864 photograph of David Livingstone

- Media related to Thomas Annan at Wikimedia Commons

His works include:

- Bond and free: five sketches illustrative of slavery. by J Noel Paton, photographed by Thomas Annan (1863)
- Portrait of David Livingstone (1864)
- Photographs of Glasgow College (1866)
- The painted windows of Glasgow Cathedral: A series of forty three photographs (1867)
- Photographs of Glasgow with descriptive letterpress (1868)
- Days at the coast, or the firth of Clyde, its watering places, scenery, and associations. (1868)
- Illustrated catalogue of the exhibition of photographs in the new galleries of art, Corporation building, Sauchiehall Street, photographed by Thomas Annan (1868)
- Three old maps of Glasgow, photographed by Annan. 1. Glasgow in 1777 by McArthur 2.Glasgow in 1807 by Fleming 3. Map of the Environs of Scotland in 1795 by Richardson (1871)
- Glasgow improvements act 1868: photographs of streets, closes & c. Taken 1868 – 71 (1872)
- Scottish landscape: The works of Horatio McCulloch, with a sketch of his life by Alexander Fraser. Photographed by Thomas Annan (1872)
- Historical notices of the United Presbyterian congregations in Glasgow by John Logan Aikman with photographs by Thomas Annan (1874)
- Photographic views of Loch Katrine, and some of the principal works constructed for introducing the water of Loch Katrine to the city of Glasgow (1877)
- The old country houses of the old Glasgow gentry. One hundred photographs by Annan with descriptive notices of the houses and families by John Buchanan (1878)
- Photographs of old closes, streets, & c. Taken 1868 – 77. Glasgow City Improvement Trust (1878)
- The castles and mansions of Ayrshire, illustrated in seventy views, with historical and descriptive accounts by AH Millar (1885)

=== Posthumous ===
After his death in 1887, the firm continued to produce volumes of photography, including the third photogravure edition of Old Closes and Streets, in 1900.

- The castles and mansions of Renfrewshire and Buteshire, illustrated in sixty-five views, with historical and descriptive accounts by AH Millar (1889)
- University of Glasgow Old and New, edited by William Stewart, illustrated with views and portraits in photogravure by Thomas Annan (1891)
- Photographs of Glasgow Harbour and Docks, taken 1892 – 1898
- The old closes and streets of Glasgow, engraved by Annan from photographs taken for the city of Glasgow improvement trust, with an introduction by William Young (1900)
