= Eastbourne Herald =

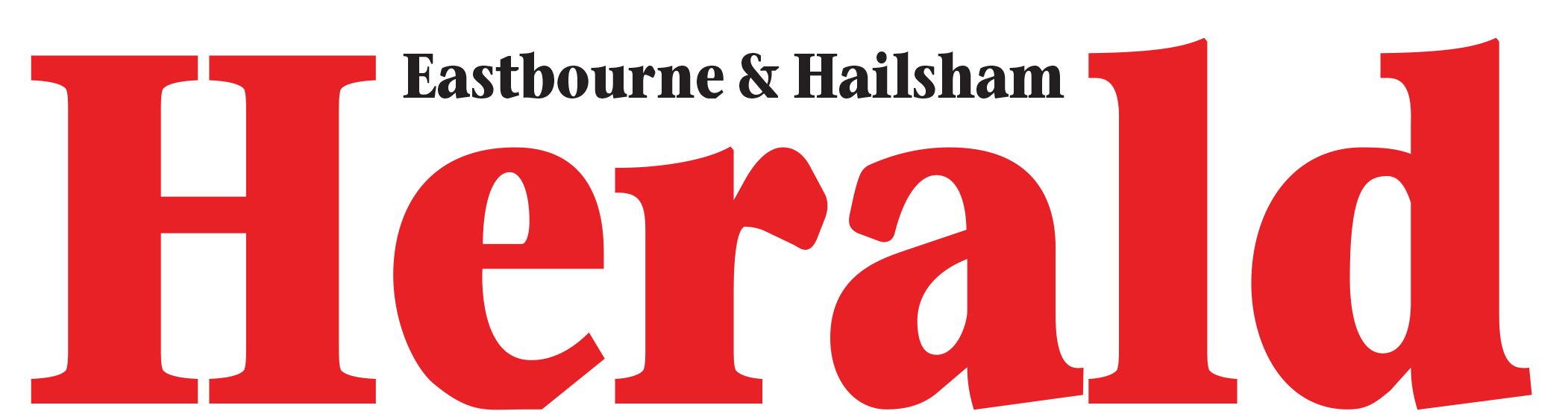
- Type: Weekly newspaper
- Format: Tabloid
- Publisher: National World
- Editor: Michael Mackenzie
- Founded: 1865 (as Eastbourne Chronicle)
- Language: English
- Headquarters: 12 Station St, Eastbourne, BN21 4RG
- Circulation: 4,166 (as of 2024)
- ISSN: 0962-9882
- Website: eastbourneherald.co.uk

The Eastbourne Herald, commonly known locally as just The Herald, is a weekly tabloid newspaper, published on Fridays and published since 1865 in Eastbourne, England.

== History ==
The newspaper was originally named the Eastbourne Chronicle but changed its name to the Eastbourne Herald Chronicle in 1951. The name remained until 1966 when then name was shortened to the Eastbourne Herald. Nowadays, the paper is edited and created by National World.

== Sister newspaper ==
The Herald also had a sister newspaper, owned by Beckett Newspapers, called the Eastbourne Gazette. The Gazette was published on Wednesdays and was cheaper than the Herald. Until the Gazette ceased publication in 2016, Eastbourne was one of the few remaining towns in the UK which had a midweek paid-for newspaper as well as an end-of-week title.

The Herald is currently part of the Sussex World family which also includes newspapers such as the Hastings Observer, Bexhill Observer, Sussex Express, Brighton and Hove Independent, Worthing Herald, Chichester Observer, West Sussex County Times and Crawley Observer.
