= Alfred Dyer =

British journalist, politician, and chief executive

Sir Alfred Dyer JP
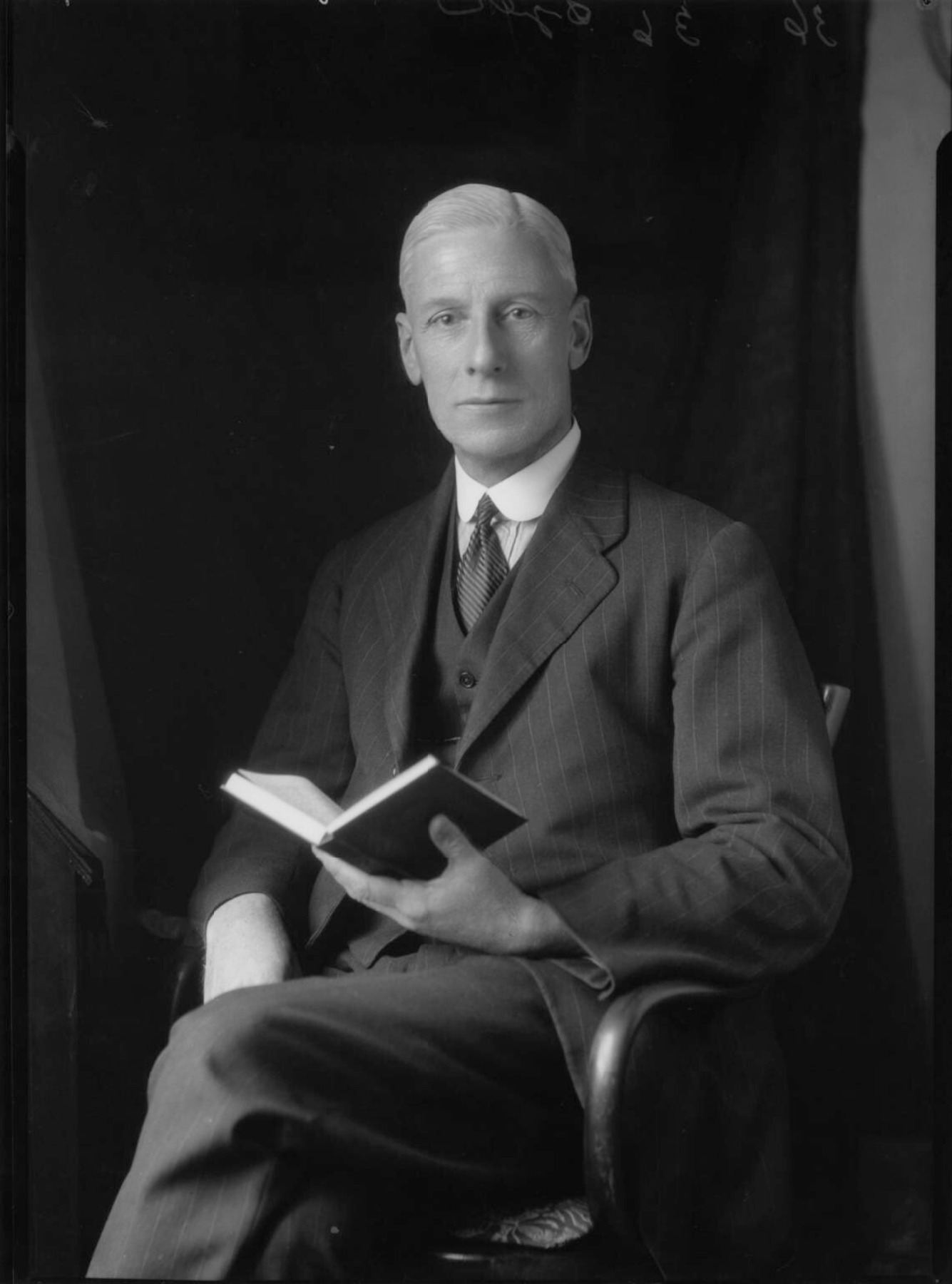
- Portrait of Dyer in 1927
- Born: 9 February 1865; Dover, England
- Died: 15 November 1947 (aged 82); St Leonards-on-Sea, England
- Occupations: Newspaper editor; politician
- Spouse: Lady Edith Kate Havill
- Children: 2

Sir Alfred Dyer JP (9 February 1865 – 15 November 1947) was a British journalist, chief executive, and Conservative Party politician. In the course of his long career, he held a great number of offices in the Hastings borough.

== Life ==
Born at Dover on 9 February 1865 and educated privately, Dyer served his apprenticeship with Messrs. F. J. Parsons LTD at their Hastings office, where he was later chief executive officer, and then went to take up a journalistic career in the Midlands and the West of England. It was while he was on the staff of an Exeter paper that he met his wife, Edith Kate Havill, who was a member of a well-known family in that city. For several years, he was editor of the Gravesend and Northfleet Standard, and he then joined the staff of the Daily Mail for a time as reporter and then as sports editor and subsequently night editor.

Dyer resigned his Fleet Street post to become editor of the Hastings & St Leonards Observer on the death of the first editor in 1902. With the full support and encouragement of his employers, the new Observer editor began a vigorous press campaign to revitalise the town. The Observer became the mouthpiece of the Progressive League and Dyer lost no opportunity of urging upon the Hastings Borough Council and readers of the day his wish for bolder policies in the town's affairs.

The efforts of the Progressive League succeeded in spite of apathy and opposition, and though the First World War held up the realisation of many good schemes, Dyer and his fellow crusaders had the satisfaction between the wars of seeing a greatly improved and modernised Hastings taking its rightful place in the forefront of British holiday and residential resorts. The development of Hastings from the point of view of attractiveness and prosperity was the only one of the causes to which Dyer devoted his journalist support. He gave it also to the hospitals and to philanthropic and welfare organisations of many kinds in the borough.

During the First World War, Dyer was chairman of the Recruiting Committee and the Military Advisory Committee, and when hostilities ended he became honorary secretary of the War Memorial Fund, through which £62,000 was raised for the voluntary hospitals. He also compiled the Borough Roll of Honour.

A keen bowler, Dyer was the first captain of the White Rock Bowling Club, which was formed in the Spring of 1916. When the Rosemount Bowling Club was formed in 1921, Eustace Percy, 1st Baron Percy of Newcastle was invited to become its president and Dyer its vice-president. When Percy left the constituency in 1937, Dyer became the club's second president, which he retained until his death. The development of Hastings as a centre of bowls is largely due to his advocacy.

Dyer was one of the founders of the Ex-Service Men's Club formed immediately after the First World War, and for some time was its honorary secretary. Later, he successfully appealed for funds to provide for the local branch of the British legion, and was appointed an honorary member of the Legion and became one of the trustees of the local headquarters. He took a keen and active interest in movements to alleviate distress among local unemployed in the years between the wars.

Dyer was appointed a director of the Hastings and East Sussex Buildings Society in 1921 and chairman in 1940. He was a local director of the Sun Insurance Office.

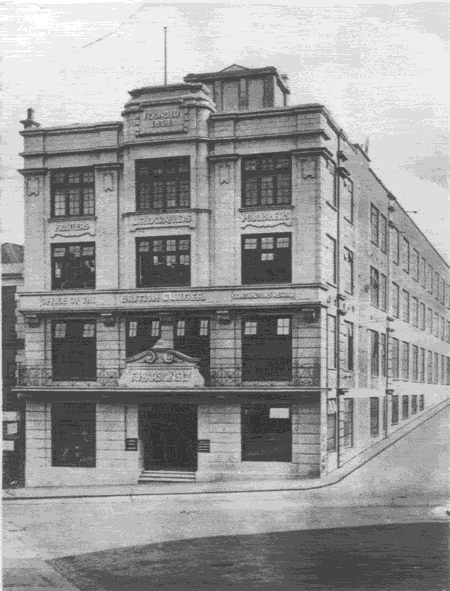
Hastings & St Leonards Observer building in 1924

For twenty-five years he was chairman of the Hastings and St. Leonards Conservative Association, retiring from the position in July 1946. During his period of service, nine Parliamentary elections, including two by-elections were held in the borough, in all of which the Conservative candidate was successful. Dyer was a member of the Executive Council of the Primrose League and for a time served as Deputy Ruling Councillor. He was also keenly interested in the local parliament, in which for many years he held the position of speaker.

Dyer was made a life governor of the Buchanan Hospital in 1923 and was appointed to the Board of Management the same year. He served for twenty years before retiring. He was also made a governor of the Royal East Sussex Hospital in 1924 for services rendered and served on the General Committee from 1922 to 1945, when he resigned. For several years he was chairman of the committee which organised fetes for the hospitals, and in 1932 succeeded Arthur Thorpe as chairman of the Hastings and St. Leonards Golden Penny League.

Dyer took an especially keen interest in the progress of the Hastings Round Table, of which he was president from its inception in 1929 until his death.

Dyer was appointed a justice of the peace for Hastings in 1925. He was knighted in the 1936 Birthday Honours for "political and public services in Hastings," and the great number of congratulatory messages he received included many tributes to efforts he had made through the Observer and in other ways to further the progress of Hastings.

Dyer also held several important positions in Freemasonry. He was Past Provincial Grand Warden of Sussex and Past Master of the Hastings Lodge, of which he was secretary for twenty-five years. He was for many years chairman of the Hastings Masonic Hall Company and was an honorary member of the St. Michael's, Andredesweald and St. Richard Lodges, P. Z. of the Emulation Chapter No. 40, Royal Arch Masons, and one of the founders and first Principal of the Hastings Chapter. He was also Past Most Wise Sovereign, Albion Chapter, Rose Croix.

== Death ==
Sir Alfred Dyer died on 15 November 1947 in the Buchanan Hospital in St Leonards-on-Sea, survived by his son and daughter. He had been in failing health for some time following the death of his wife on 4 March 1946.

Tribute was paid by the Mayor of Hastings, Alderman F. W. Chambers, who said it was fitting that they should recognise the great loss the Bench, the town, and the country had suffered. Chambers relayed from his own experience that Dyer had brought to his task on the bench a mind always balanced, always cool in judgement, always fair, always impartial. He contributed in very marked degree to all good causes in the town, and many people and many societies mourned his loss, as his fellow magistrates did.

At a meeting of the National Union of Journalists, branch chairman A. J. Marshall said that not only was Dyer a very well-known journalist, but he was a most public-spirited man, who did a great deal of work for his town outside his office. Many of the members had been associated with him in a professional capacity for a number of years, and all those who knew him admired his high integrity as a journalist, and had learned to regard him with affection and esteem. The meeting stood in silence, and it was agreed that a letter be written to Major W. H. Dyer, Corporation Publicity Officer, who was a member of the branch, expressing sympathy with him and the other members of the family in their bereavement.

Dyer remains the only editor of a Sussex newspaper upon whom a knighthood has ever been bestowed.
