= Eastbourne Gazette =

Newspaper

- Type: Weekly newspaper
- Format: Tabloid
- Owner(s): Beckett Newspapers
- Publisher: Johnston Press
- Editor: Peter Austin (journalist)
- Founded: 1859
- Language: English
- Headquarters: Beckett House, 1 Commercial Road, Eastbourne, East Sussex BN21 3XQ.
- Website: http://www.eastbournegazette.co.uk (Link is dead)

The Eastbourne Gazette, commonly known as just The Gazette, was a weekly tabloid newspaper, printed on Wednesdays and published from 1859 to 2016 in Eastbourne, England.

== History ==
The Gazette was the town's first newspaper. Later, the paper was edited and created by Beckett Newspapers, based in Eastbourne, and printed by Johnston Press at their headquarters in Hilsea, Portsmouth. Aleister Crowley once edited a chess column for the paper.

From September 2015 until its closure it relaunched itself briefly as a free broadsheet.

== Sister newspaper ==
The Gazette also had a sister newspaper, owned by Beckett Newspapers, called the Eastbourne Herald. The Herald is printed on a Friday and is more expensive than the Gazette. Eastbourne was one of the few remaining towns in the UK which had a midweek paid-for newspaper as well as an end-of-week title until the Gazette published its final issue in late 2016 and merged with the Herald.
