= Joseph M. Scriven =

Irish-Canadian poet

Joseph Medlicott Scriven (10 September 1819 – 10 August 1886) was an Irish-born Canadian poet, best known as the writer of the poem which became the hymn "What a Friend We Have in Jesus".

== Life ==
Joseph Scriven was born in 1819 of prosperous parents in Banbridge, County Down, Ireland. He graduated with a degree from Trinity College Dublin in 1842. His fiancée accidentally drowned in 1843, the night before they were to be married. In 1844, at the age of 25, Scriven left his native country and migrated to Canada, settling in Woodstock, Ontario. He left his country feeling a spiritual calling to serve the Lord in his Plymouth Brethren faith. He only remained in Canada briefly after becoming ill, but returned for good in 1847.

For two or three years he conducted a private school at Brantford. In 1855, while staying with James Sackville in Bewdley, Ontario, north of Port Hope, he received news from Ireland of his mother being terribly ill. He wrote a poem to comfort his mother called "Pray Without Ceasing". It was later set to music and renamed by Charles Crozat Converse, becoming the hymn "What a Friend We Have in Jesus". Scriven did not have any intentions nor dream that his poem would be for publication in the newspaper and later becoming a favorite hymn among the millions of Christians around the world.

About 1857 he moved near to Port Hope, Ontario where he again fell in love and was due to be married, but in August 1860 his fiancée fell ill with pneumonia and died.

He then devoted the rest of his life to tutoring, preaching and helping others.

In 1869 Scriven published a collection of 115 Hymns and other verses which did not include "What a friend".

Scriven drowned in 1886 at age 66. At the time of his death he was very ill with fever, and had been brought to a friend's home to recover. It was a very hot night, and he may have possibly gone outside to cool down, or to get a drink of cold water from the spring. His friend reported, "We left him about midnight. I withdrew to an adjoining room to watch and pray. You may imagine my surprise and dismay when upon visiting his room I found it empty. All search failed to find a trace of the missing man, until a little after noon his body was discovered in the nearby river, lifeless and cold in death." He was buried next to his second fiancée in her family cemetery near Bewdley.

== Memorials ==
A tall obelisk was built upon his grave with the words from the song and the following inscription:

This monument was erected to the memory of Joseph M. Scriven, B.A., by lovers of his hymn, which is engraved hereon, and is his best memorial. Born at Seapatrick, Co. Down, Ireland, 10 Sept. 1819, emigrated to Canada 1844. Entered into rest at Bewdley, Rice Lake, 10 August 1886, and buried here. Blessed are the pure in heart for they shall see God.

A plaque can be found on the Port Hope-Peterborough Highway with the following inscription:

Four miles north, in the family Pengelley Cemetery, lies the philanthropist and author of this great masterpiece, written at Port Hope, 1857. The composer of the music, Charles C. Converse, was a well-educated versatile and successful Christian, whose talents ranged from law to professional music. Under the pen name of Karl Reden, he wrote numerous scholarly articles on many subjects. Though he was an excellent musician and composer with many of his works performed by the leading American orchestras and choirs of his day, his life is best remembered for this simple music so well suited to Scriven's text.

From an article published in the Banbridge Chronicle by the late J.Harris Rea, who was a well known local historian.

Joseph Scriven, described as one who lived the Christian life of service to his fellows, was born at Ballymoney Lodge, Banbridge on the 10th of September 1819. His father was Captain John Scriven of the Royal Marines; His mother was Jane Medlicott, sister of a Wiltshire Vicar, the Rev. Joseph Medlicott whom her son was named after.

There is now a monument on Downshire Place, put up by Banbridge District Council and recently a stained glass window was dedicated to J.M. Scriven, the dedication being carried out by Bishop Henry Scriven, who was then Suffragan Bishop of Gibraltar in Europe and is the great-great-grandnephew of Joseph Scriven. Joseph had two brothers— George born 1821 and John born 1823— and one sister Catherine Anne Mary, born in 1825.

== In popular culture ==
Lukas Media LLC, released the full-length documentary Friends in Jesus, The stories and Hymns of Cecil Frances Alexander and Joseph Scriven in 2011. The 45 minutes documentary movie details the life of Joseph M. Scriven and his influence on popular hymns.
