= Robert Lilley (newspaper editor) =

Robert Hugh Lilley OBE (4 December 1938 – 9 February 2023) was a Northern Irish journalist and newspaper editor, best known for serving as the editor of the Belfast Telegraph from 1974 to 1992, especially during The Troubles.

== Biography ==
Born in Belfast, Lilley was the only son of Hugh Lilley, a security guard, and Martha Lilley (née McMeekin). After the early death of his mother, he was raised by his father and stepmother Sarah (née Gilbert). He attended Larne Grammar School and began his journalism career at the Larne Times in 1957 before transferring to the Belfast Telegraph in 1959.

From 1962 to 1964, Lilley served as political correspondent for the Belfast Telegraph. Between 1965 and 1967, he was Westminster lobby correspondent for Thomson Regional Newspapers. Returning to Belfast, he rose through the editorial ranks, serving as leader writer, assistant editor, deputy editor, and eventually editor from 1974 to 1992.

On September 17, 1976, the Belfast Telegraph offices were targeted in a bomb attack by the Provisional IRA, resulting in the death of one staff member and injuries to several others. Despite extensive damage to the building, Lilley led the production of an emergency four-page edition the next day, known informally as the "Penny Marvel." The incident demonstrated the paper's commitment to continuing publication amid difficult conditions.

During his career, Lilley was actively involved in promoting dialogue between unionist and nationalist communities, hosting figures from various political backgrounds at Belfast Telegraph events. He retired from the paper in 1998, coinciding with the signing of the Good Friday Agreement. He received an OBE in 1998, an honour he accepted after his retirement.

== Personal life ==
Lilley was married to Georgie (née Bell) and had two daughters.

== Awards and recognition ==
In 1977, Lilley received the Golden Pen of Freedom award from the International Federation of Newspaper Publishers for his commitment to press freedom during the Troubles.
