= News Post Leader =

British newspaper

- Type: Weekly newspaper
- Format: Tabloid
- Owner: National World
- Editor: Amanda Bourn
- Founded: 1874 (as Blyth News)
- Political alignment: Non-aligned
- Language: English (UK)
- Headquarters: Morpeth, Northumberland
- Circulation: 238 (as of 2023)
- ISSN: 1753-7266
- Website: northumberlandgazette.co.uk

The News Post Leader is a British paid-for weekly that covers the north-east county of Northumberland, including the towns of Cramlington, Ashington, Bedlington and Blyth.

== History ==
The paper was formed from the amalgamation of several south-east Northumberland titles during the 1960s, 1970s and 1980s the oldest of which was the Blyth News founded in 1874. The paper was taken over by Johnston Press in 1999. The News Post Leader title was arrived at from the amalgamation of the paid-for News Post with the freesheet Leader in August 1982. The resulting paper was a freesheet until 30 April 2021, when it became a paid-for title. In December 2021, its website was amalgamated with that of its sister title the Northumberland Gazette.

== Content ==
The paper tends to have a focus on community news and events, mixed with its heavy advertising of local companies that is evident throughout. It also tends to cover local politics and the affairs of Northumberland County Council, as well as local sports such as local football team Blyth Spartans.
