= Horncastle News =

Weekly newspaper based in Horncastle, Lincolnshire, England

- Type: Weekly newspaper
- Owner(s): National World
- Circulation: 716 (as of 2023)
- Website: lincolnshireworld.com

Horncastle News is a weekly newspaper which serves Horncastle, Lincolnshire, England and the surrounding area.

== History ==
It was founded in 1885 by William Kirkham Morton, who already owned a printing and stationery business in the town. In 1958, the News and Mortons of Horncastle were facing closure when they were bought by Charles Edward “Teddy” Sharpe, owner of the Market Rasen Mail. From 1935 to 1969 it was known as the Horncastle & Spa News. In 2001, the Horncastle News and Market Rasen Mail were sold to Johnston Press. According to data from analysts JICREG, weekly circulation of Horncastle News was 4,936 in the period January–June 2009. In 2022, this decreased to 910 copies.
