= Arbroath Herald =

The Arbroath Herald
- Type: Weekly newspaper
- Owner: National World
- Founded: 1838
- Ceased publication: 2021
- City: Arbroath, Angus, Scotland

The Arbroath Herald Guide and Gazette, usually referred to simply as The Arbroath Herald, was a local weekly newspaper covering events in and around Arbroath, Angus, Scotland. It was founded in 1838 and merged with five other newspapers in 2021 to form Angus County Press.

== History ==
Established in 1838, the paper has had just seven editors. Up until 1975 the newspaper was printed in the burgh.

The "Herald" was bought by the Johnston Press in 1998 at which time its circulation was approximately 7000 per week. In 2005 the Johnston Press reported its circulation was up to 10,030. 2004 was the first time news items were carried on the front page, where previously adverts and notices were displayed.

Historical copies of the Arbroath Herald, dating back to 1889, are available to search and view in digitised form at The British Newspaper Archive.
