= Ellon Times =

Weekly newspaper serving Aberdeenshire, Scotland

- Type: Weekly newspaper
- Owner: National World
- Circulation: 138 (as of 2023)
- Website: www.ellontimes.co.uk

The Ellon Times is a local, weekly newspaper based in Ellon, Aberdeenshire. It is a sister paper of the Buchan Observer, Fraserburgh Herald and Inverurie Herald.

The Times covers a range of local news and sport, with a coverage area which includes Ellon and the surrounding villages of Auchnagatt, Balmedie, Collieston, Cruden Bay, Formartine, Methlick, Newburgh, Pitmedden, Tarves and Udny Green.

The newspaper's ownership was transferred between Archant and Johnston Press in 2007. After Johnston Press went into administration in 2018, JPIMedia took ownership of its assets.
