= Market Rasen Mail =

Newspaper in England

- Type: Weekly newspaper
- Owner: National World
- Founder: Richard Hackett
- Founded: 1856
- Circulation: 518 (as of 2024)
- Website: lincolnshireworld.com

The Market Rasen Mail is a weekly newspaper which serves Market Rasen, Lincolnshire, England and the surrounding area.

== History ==
It was founded in 1856 by Richard Hackett (1823 – 1892), the son of a local farmer. At the age of 18 Hacket was working as an apprentice to a printer in Queen Street, Market Rasen. After a period as a bookseller in London, he returned to Market Rasen to establish the Market Rasen Weekly Mail and Lincolnshire Advertiser. The first edition was published on 20 September 1856.

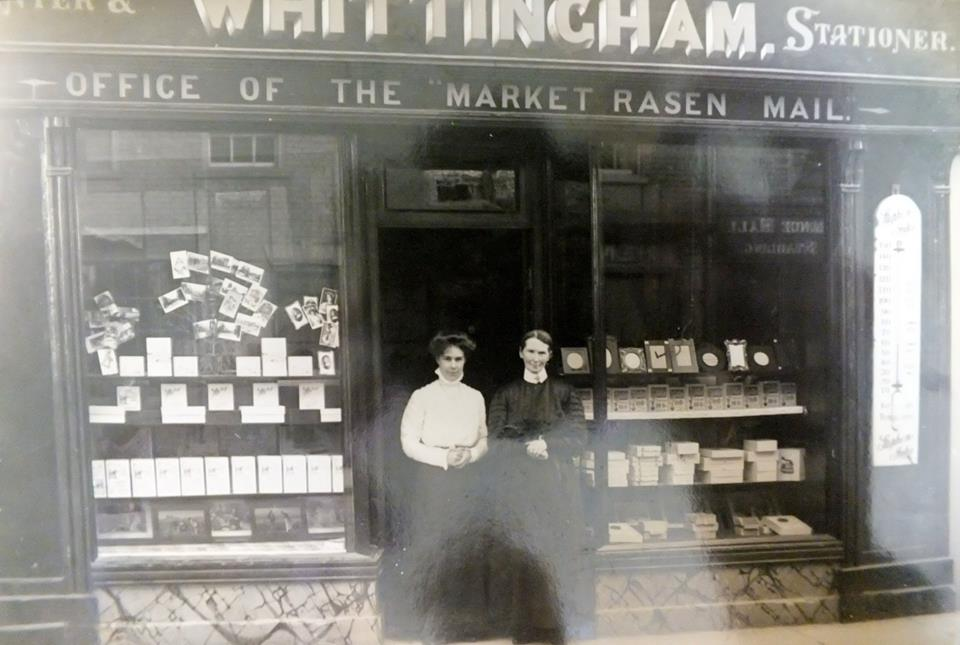
Office of the Market Rasen Mail on Queen Street, Market Rasen probably in the 1890s with members of the Whittingham family

In about 1870 the newspaper was sold to Thomas Hulme Whittingham. Whittingham edited the paper and installed new printing equipment in his premises on Queen Street. After his death his widow and sons ran the paper until Thomas Baty was taken on as editor in 1905. In 1915 ownership was transferred to the new company Whittingham & Baty Ltd. Baty was succeeded as editor by E. W. Chapman and then C. E. Sharpe.

In 1947 the Mail was bought by the editor Charles Edward "Teddy" Sharpe, who remained associated with the title until he died in 1983. He modernised the business, replacing the Victorian printing presses and expanded it by buying the Horncastle News and the printing company Mortons of Horncastle. In 2001 the Mail was bought by Johnston Press.

=== 2008 Earthquake ===
One of the biggest stories reported by the paper was the 2008 Lincolnshire earthquake, measuring 5.2 on the Richter Scale, when Market Rasen was at the epicentre. Reporters responded with a multi-media package of articles, videos, eye-witness accounts and reader submissions.
