= Harborough Mail =

Newspaper in England

The Harborough Mail
- Type: Weekly newspaper
- Owner: National World
- Founded: 1854
- Circulation: 1,277 (as of 2023)
- Website: harboroughmail.co.uk

The Harborough Mail is a weekly newspaper which serves Market Harborough and the surrounding area. The Harborough Mail was owned by Welland Valley Newspapers, a company established in April 1883, but is now part of Northamptonshire Newspapers but the Harborough Mail itself was established in 1854. Northants Newspapers and Welland Valley Newspapers are both part of Johnston Press. The newspaper is brought out every Thursday and contains the usual local newspaper fair such as local news and sport results. The newspaper also contains a cartoon called 'Mal & Lard' - which features two ducks called Mal and Lard, and a children's club called "Harbie's Gang". Harbie the newshound makes regular appearances at public events and has a whole page dedicated to him and his gang every week. The Mal & Lard cartoon is drawn by Harborough artist Nathan Shelton under his business name Ant Creations.

In April 2006, the Harborough Mail began publishing a secondary free-sheet delivered directly to homes within Market Harborough, the Harborough Citizen.

== History ==
The paper began in a dusty cellar in Church Street, Harborough in 1854, when a Harborough printer and stationer laid down the foundations of the Harborough Mail. Below is a timeline of the important events over the last century and a half that have helped shape Mr Eland's Market Harboro' Advertiser into today's Harborough paper.

- January 1854: The Market Harboro' Advertiser is launched as a monthly issue by William Eland, a printer and stationer, from his offices in Church Street. Eland took advantage of the abolition of Advertisement Duty to convince businesses it was cheaper to advertise in the paper rather than use printed bills. Eland also wanted to enrich the paper with "gems of literature of a miscellaneous but instructive and entertaining character." By the sixth edition, it expanded to twelve pages but only the four outside sheets contained Harborough affairs, the rest was national content.
- 1890: On Friday 3 October, a rival publication, The Market Harborough Mail, is issued by Northamptonshire Printing and Publishing Co. It is priced 1d and Alfred James Tompkins is the paper's first editor.
- 1891: Eland sells the Advertiser to a small limited company.
- 1897: The rival Mail is renamed the Midland Mail on 3 July. It announced: "The Mail has so far outgrown its title that it becomes necessary to give it a new one."
- 1899: Before the turn of the 20th century, the Mail was sold to JW Logan, Liberal MP for Harborough, and on his death in 1922 ownership passed to his parliamentary secretary Charles Coppack.
- 1923: Coppack died in February and Tompkins bought the Mail in March after 33 years with the paper.
- 1923: In November, the two papers merge to become the Market Harborough Advertiser and Midland Mail with the first edition issued on Friday 16 November. It announced: "It has been thought wise to amalgamate the two local papers. The paper will be published on Fridays."
- 1930s: 'Long' Liz Hollingsworth becomes a renowned newspaper seller at her pitch in Factory Lane.
- 1942: The broadsheet format is switched to tabloid on 20 March.
- 1944: In September, after 50 years as a journalist in Harborough, Tompkins sold the paper to East Midlands Allied Press, later known as Emap, but continued to work on the paper. Tompkins retired in 1946 and died on 3 July 1947. His obituary in the Mail said: "His work as a journalist won him a reputation for honest and impartial reporting and he wrote entertainingly."
- 1948: RH Freeman becomes the paper's editor.
- 1951: 16 August, the paper decides to come out on a Thursday. It read: "This change of publication day is being made in order to give readers a better service of news, sport and pictures. We feel sure newsagents will welcome this advance, which should relieve hard-working staff of a certain amount of weekend pressure."
- 1952: Ken Hankins becomes editor; he is the youngest editor in the country when he takes charge on 16 October.
- 1968: On 14 March, the long title is abbreviated to the present Harborough Mail.
- 1974: Hankins moves to another paper after 22 years in charge. Brian W Paine takes over on 23 July.
- 1974: Sport is moved to the back pages for the first time on 1 August.
- 1980: Journalists finally get by-lines on their stories. Mail reporter Sandra Saunders gets the first ever front-page by-line on 8 May with a story: "Stoke Albany student talks of embassy agony: My Sister's Ordeal."
- 1984: On 19 April, the first edition of the Harborough Mail's sister paper the Lutterworth Mail is launched. The Mail sold more than 12,500 newspaper a week.
- 1981: Brian Paine retires as editor after seven years and is succeeded by Clive Brown.
- 1983: For the sixth half-year in a row the Mail sets new sales records. Weekly sales average 9,659.
- 1984: Gordon Birch appointed editor.
- 1992: After eight years as editor, Birch is succeeded by Carol Randall, the first female editor in the paper's history.
- 1992: The Mail embraces the computer age in October, the last paper within Emap to get computerised.
- 1992: Carol leaves to sail the world and John Dilley is appointed. Dilley was a trainee reporter for The Mail in the 1970s and a deputy editor in the 1980s. John pilots the paper through the difficult times caused by the town centre being dug up. The Roger Roadwatch character is introduced to cover town centre development.
- 1993: Kibworth gets its own news page in January, introduced to focus on the northern part of the circulation area.
- 1993: Desborough gets its own page.
- 1993: Harbie the Newshound, the paper's junior mascot, is born on 19 August.
- 1995: Welford and Brixworth receive its own page, stretching the Mail's circulation area to Northern Northamptonshire.
- 1996: The Mail's owners, Emap, sell its entire newspaper division to the Edinburgh-based Johnston Press, joining the fourth largest newspaper group in Britain. Johnston owns papers throughout the UK. The Mail is part of the Welland Valley division of Johnston, joining papers from Leicestershire and Lincolnshire.
- 1996: Tim Robinson becomes editor. Much more humour is injected into a hard news paper, highlights included the Lovely Lavs Awards.
- 1996: On 24 October colour is introduced to the paper on a permanent basis.
- 1997: In June the Mail masthead is changed to a new style.
- 1998: Tor Clark is promoted to editor on 1 January after being a deputy since 1994.
- 1999: The Millennium Mail is published and the paper helps with the Millennium Mile walkway.
- 2000: Mail breaks 12,000 and 12,500 circulation barriers.
- 2001: The Mail bursts into the national top 20 of fastest growing circulations.
- 2001: Brian Dodds becomes only the twelfth editor in the Mail's history. Brian instills an increased emphasis on hard hitting news.
- 2012: Neil Pickford takes over as editor. He is also editor at the Mail's sister title, The Northants Telegraph.

== Editors ==
1854-1891: William Eland (Harboro' Advertiser)
1890-1946: Alfred James Tompkins
1948-1952: RH Freeman
1952-1974: Ken Hankins
1974-1981: Brian Paine
1981-1984: Clive Brown
1984-1992: Gordon Birch
1992-1992: Carol Randall
1992-1996: John Dilley
1996-1998: Tim Robinson
1998-2001: Tor Clark
2001-2012: Brian Dodds
2012 - ongoing: Neil Pickford

== Current team ==
As of 2012, the news team is made up of deputy editor Alex Blackwell and reporters Ian O'Pray and Elinor O'Neill. Photography is covered by a team based out of the Mail's sister paper, The Northants Telegraph. Freelance cover is supplied by local legend Andrew 'Carps' Carpenter, who has worked for the Mail for more than 20 years.

=== The Other View ===
In July 2007, the Harborough Mail agreed to do a monthly youth page. It would give students from the local Robert Smyth School a chance to have their say on what is happening in their town. This idea came about when earlier in the year, the paper held a meeting bringing together all generations, called Hands On Harborough. At the end of the three days over which the meetings were held, a student from the Robert Smyth School approached deputy editor Rachel Lusby with the idea of a youth page. Lusby agreed and several months later The Other View had published their first page.
