= News Guardian =

Newspaper in North Tyneside, England

- Type: Weekly newspaper
- Owner: National World
- Founded: 1985
- Website: newsguardian.co.uk

The News Guardian is a free weekly newspaper covering three main areas of North Tyneside, a metropolitan district in north east England. It serves Whitley Bay, North Shields and Wallsend with news, sport, entertainment as well as regular property and motoring supplements.

The News Guardian series is owned by Sunderland-based Northeast Press Limited, a subsidiary of Johnston Press Ltd. The current News Guardian is a product of three newspaper mergers in 1985, The Whitley Bay Guardian (formerly known as the Seaside Chronicle), the Shields Weekly News and the Wallsend News. It has a distribution of around 68,000 copies.

It has a proud tradition of developing new journalistic talent and is affiliated to the National Council for the Training of Journalists. The Editor is Paul Larkin.

Over the years the newspaper has reported some of the biggest stories to hit the north east including the Meadow Well Riots on 9 September 1991, the decline of the ship yards on the Tyne, and the long-running police investigation into the Sara Cameron murder—the 21-year-old Finnish student found dead in Whitley Bay on 28 April 2000. At the time the newspaper offered a reward as part of its coverage.

The newspaper is produced from its offices in Morpeth, Northumberland. It is printed on the presses of the Johnston Press at Dinnington.
