= Times & Citizen =

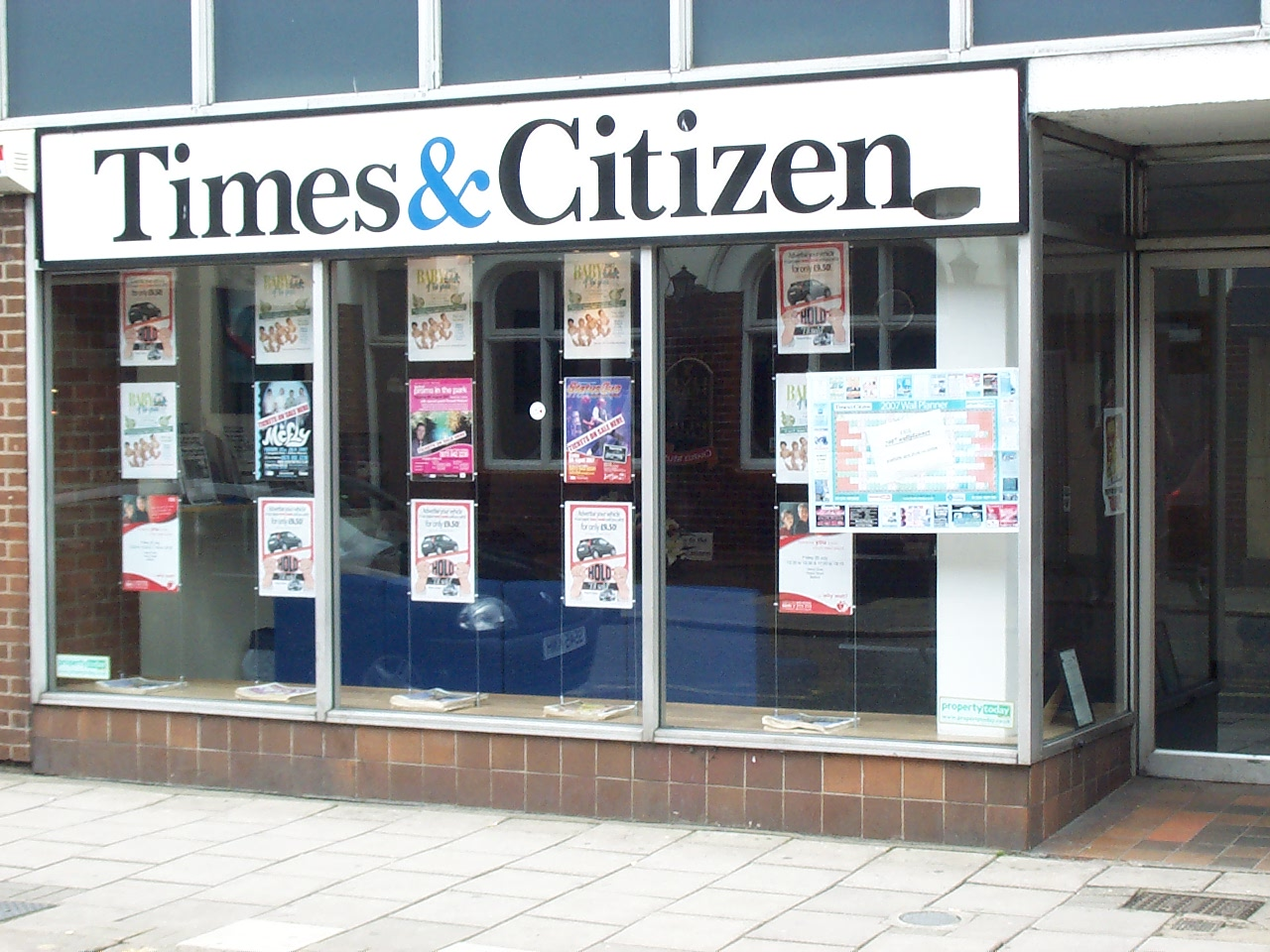
- Times & Citizen's former offices, Bedford
- Type: Weekly newspaper
- Format: Tabloid
- Owner: National World
- Publisher: National World
- Founded: 1995 (1845)
- Political alignment: left
- Headquarters: Bedford, England
- Circulation: 21,929 (as of 2023)
- Website: bedfordtoday.co.uk

The Times & Citizen is a free local newspaper published on Thursdays in Bedford, Bedfordshire, England. The newspaper is distributed all over the Borough of Bedford and much of Mid Bedfordshire. Current circulation is around 31,000.

== History ==
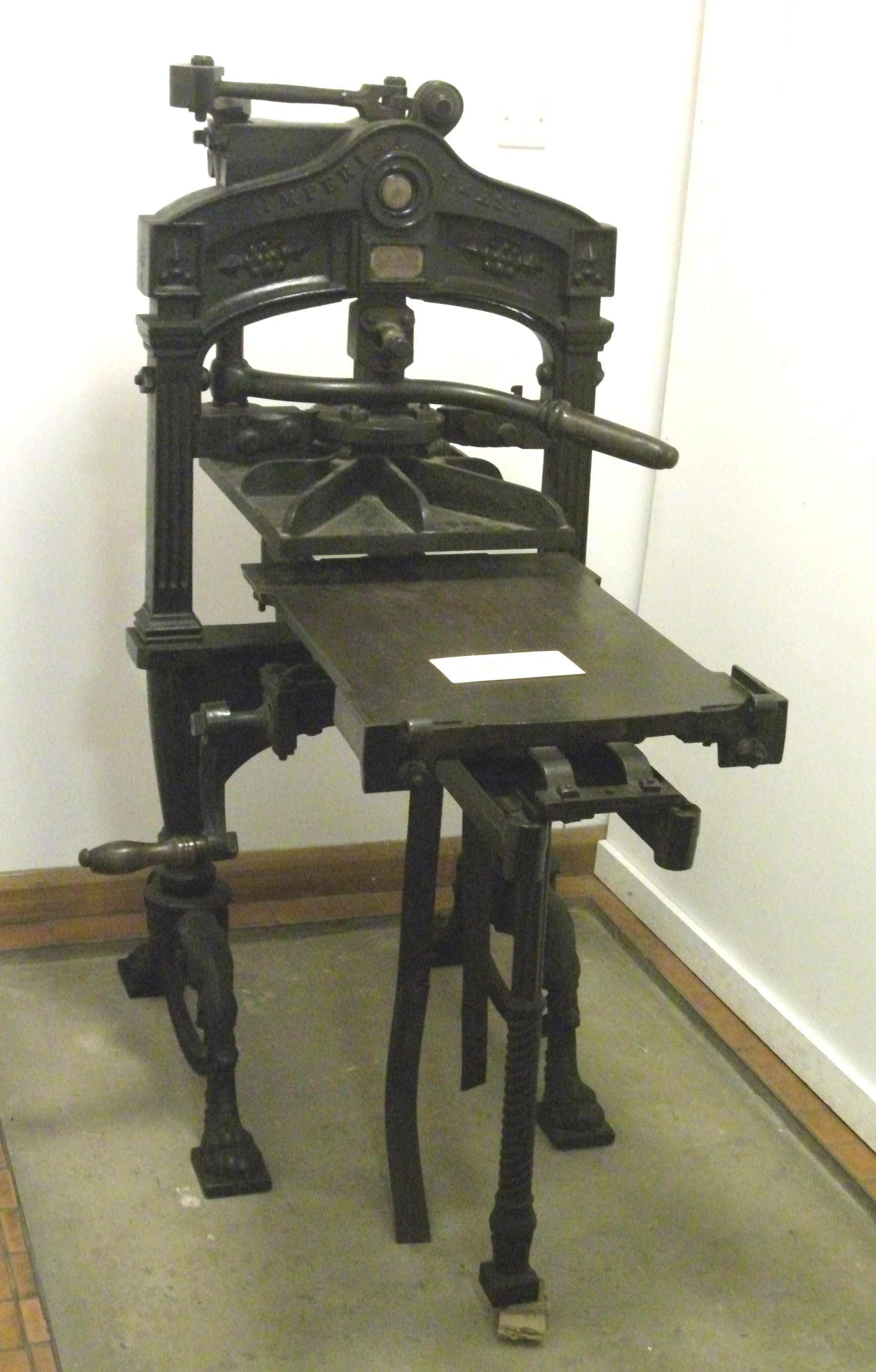
A 19th century hand press used by the Bedfordshire Times to print proofs of the front page. Now on display in Bedford Museum

First published in 1845, the Bedford Times was one of the first regular papers published for the Bedfordshire area, the shortlived Bedford Beacon and the Bedford Mercury both having started in 1837. A rival paper, the Bedfordshire Independent, was established in 1857, but the two titles merged in 1859 to become the Bedford Times and Bedfordshire Independent. The title became the Bedfordshire Times and Independent in 1872, The Bedfordshire Times and Bedfordshire Standard in 1939, and simply the Bedfordshire Times in 1965. The newspaper had an unbroken weekly production record throughout this period, apart from one week in 1959 due to a printing industry strike. In 1995, the Times merged with another local paper, the Bedford Citizen, to become the Times & Citizen. Two years later in 1997 The paper was bought by Johnston Press.

== The paper today ==
The Times & Citizen carries a range of news from across Bedford Borough and the 'mid-beds' region of Central Bedfordshire. It carries sports at the back of the paper, monthly columns from area MPs, the town's mayor and Bedford BID and entertainment.

The Times & Citizen is now the only editorially based print publication in Bedford Borough, following the closure of the Bedfordshire on Sunday in 2017, but the Bedford Independent, an online publication also serves this area.

It does, however, share and dominate the wider Central Bedfordshire and Luton areas with sister papers Biggleswade Today and Luton Today.

Since the beginning of the COVID-19 pandemic in 2020, its editorial team have been working remotely. The paper is now owned by NationalWorld Plc.

Circulation has also fallen in recent years. Media analysis company JICREG shows circulation of the Times & Citizen in 2013 at 81,734. By December 2021 media analysis by ABC, with data provided by their publisher NationalWorld, showed this had fallen to 31,181

All of the articles that appear in the print edition can also be read online at its website which also has occasional web features and videos uploaded.
