= Mirfield Reporter =

English newspaper

The Mirfield Reporter is a local weekly publication, providing news for residents of Mirfield, West Yorkshire, England, and surrounding areas.

It is owned by Johnston Press Digital Publishing, and has sister newspapers Dewsbury Reporter, Wakefield Express, Batley News and Birstall News.

In July 2008 Hannah Ridgeway replaced Richard Firth as the newspaper's editor after previously working on the Halifax Courier and as deputy editor on the Brighouse Echo.
