= Buxton Advertiser =

Weekly newspaper in Buxton, England

- Edition of 6 May 2010
- Type: Weekly newspaper
- Owner: National World
- Publisher: JPI Media
- Editor: Louise Cooper
- Language: English
- Headquarters: Buxton, Derbyshire, UK
- Circulation: 2,333 (as of 2023)
- ISSN: 0966-5862
- OCLC number: 500151887
- Website: buxtonadvertiser.co.uk

The Buxton Advertiser is an English weekly local newspaper published in Buxton, Derbyshire, and distributed throughout the High Peak area by Johnston Press.

The paper was first published in 1852 and comes out on Thursdays. It merged with the Buxton Herald and Gazette of Fashion in 1951.
