= Lytham St Annes Express =

Local English newspaper

- Type: Weekly newspaper
- Format: Tabloid
- Owner: National World
- Publisher: Blackpool Gazette
- Headquarters: Avroe House
- Circulation: 1,108 (as of 2023)
- Sister newspapers: Fleetwood Weekly
- Website: lythamstannesexpress.co.uk

Lytham St Annes Express is a local weekly newspaper, named after Lytham St Annes largely serving the Fylde Borough in Lancashire, England. It is published by the Blackpool Gazette and therefore owned by Johnson Press.
