= BirminghamWorld =

Media company in United Kingdom

- BirminghamWorld logo
- Website type: News; Politics; Sport
- Available in: English
- Owner: National World
- Editor: Fionnuala Bourke
- Website: www.birminghamworld.uk
- Commercial: Yes
- Launched: 2021
- Current status: Active

BirminghamWorld is a news media publisher based in the United Kingdom, aimed at people in Birmingham and the West Midlands.

Launched in late 2021, BirminghamWorld is part of a portfolio of UK news websites launched by National World plc, the new owners of JPIMedia.

== Background ==
Following the acquisition of JPIMedia Publishing by National World Plc in January 2021, the company began expanding its footprint into several major metropolitan areas in the UK.

Having successfully launched a new national newspaper online, Nationalworld.com, the group launched similar websites in eight regions: Manchester, Liverpool, Newcastle, Glasgow, London, Birmingham, Bristol and Wales.

Fionnuala Bourke, former Commercial Audience Editor at Reach plc - Midlands, Cheshire and Lincolnshire, was appointed as Editor for BirminghamWorld.

== Content ==
BirminghamWorld follows the objectives of its sister titles, all under the NationalWorld editorial ethos.

NationalWorld describes itself as a "national news brand, produced by a team of journalists, editors, video producers and designers who live and work across the UK" with the "aim to provide incisive, informed and intelligent coverage of the issues that matter".

The media platform divides its news output into sub-sections including News, Football, Health, Transport, People, Lifestyle, Property, What's On, Your Birmingham, and current topical news including the Gaza and Ukraine crises from a local perspective.
