= Bridlington Free Press =

Weekly newspaper published in Bridlington

- Type: Weekly newspaper
- Format: Tabloid
- Owner(s): National World
- Editor: Ed Asquith
- Circulation: 1,281 (as of 2023)
- Sister newspapers: Scarborough News
- ISSN: 0963-455X
- Website: bridlingtonfreepress.co.uk

The Bridlington Free Press is a newspaper that was launched in 1859, is now owned by National World and is distributed in the Bridlington area of the East Riding of Yorkshire, England.

A new edition of the paper is released every Thursday.

The editor is Steve Bambridge who is also editor of The Scarborough News, The Pocklington Post, The Filey Mercury and The Whitby Gazette.

The paper also employs a number of freelance editorial and photographic staff members.

A new independent paper, the Bridlington Echo was launched in July 2016 in competition against the Bridlington Free Press.
