= Montrose Review =

- Owner: Johnston Press
- Founded: 11 January 1811
- Ceased publication: June 2021
- Website: montrosereview.com

The Montrose Review was established on 11 January 1811, with the full title of The Montrose, Arbroath and Brechin Review, and Forfar and Kincardine Shires Advertiser. It was circulated widely throughout the counties of Angus and Kincardineshire.

The Montrose Review was at one time edited by Hugh MacDiarmid.

The Review was joined by another Montrose newspaper, the Standard in 1837. The Standard ceased publication in 1964. The Review had been published for 210 years and was Scotland's second oldest weekly newspaper until it ceased as a separate publication in June 2021 and was merged by owners JPI Media with other local newspapers under the title Angus County Press.
