= Diss Express =

English newspaper

- Owner: Iliffe Media Group Ltd
- Founded: 1864
- Circulation: 1,132 (as of 2023)
- Website: dissexpress.co.uk

The Diss Express is an English newspaper that covers a 500-square-mile circulation area on the Norfolk-Suffolk border. It was owned by Johnston Press, and a print edition was released every Friday. Major towns and villages covered by the Diss Express include Diss, Eye, Harleston, Debenham and Long Stratton.

== History ==
The paper was founded by Mr Abbott in November 1864 as the Diss Express and Norfolk & Suffolk Journal.

In January 2017, it was bought, along with twelve other titles, by Iliffe Media for £17 million. Since then, it has been printed in Cambridge.
