= The Scotsman Publications =

Parent company of The Scotsman newspaper

The Scotsman Publications Limited (TSPL) was the holding company of The Scotsman, Scotland on Sunday, Edinburgh Evening News and Herald & Post newspapers, and of the Scotsman.com website.

The company was based in Edinburgh, Scotland. In December 2005 it was sold by Press Holdings in a £160 million deal to Johnston Press. Johnston Press entered administration in November 2018. All assets were acquired by JPIMedia.
