= Cumbernauld News & Kilsyth Chronicle =

Scottish newspaper

- Owner: National World
- Circulation: 400 (as of 2023)
- Website: glasgowworld.com

The Cumbernauld News & Kilsyth Chronicle is a local paper serving the areas of Cumbernauld and Kilsyth and all the other villages in between the two towns.

== History ==
Originally two separate newspapers, the two joined and became sister papers along with the Falkirk Herald. The Chronicle was a local paper for the town of Kilsyth and surrounding areas, until the Cumbernauld New Town was created and with a small local paper, The Cumbernauld News created in June 1961 by the Falkirk Herald less than a week before a paper, the Cumbernauld Courier, was started by the Airdrie & Coatbridge Advertiser. The locals mostly bought the News and the Courier eventually closed. Then in an attempt to boost sales of the Chronicle and News they joined as one paper for both towns.

Cumbernauld HIT, a CDC sponsored comedy film from 1977, features the Cumbernauld News largely in its plot. With hints of The Avengers and Taggart, it about an evil woman's plan to hijack the New Town of Cumbernauld with a bio-weapon and the attempts of Noddy News journalists to stop her. There are many shots of the old Town Centre and the Cumbernauld News offices from the inside throughout the promotional film.
