= The Star (Sheffield newspaper) =

Regional paper for South Yorkshire, England

- Type: Daily newspaper
- Format: Tabloid
- Owner: National World
- Publisher: Sheffield Newspapers Ltd
- Editor: Print Editor Charles Smith / Digital Editor Claire Lewis
- Founded: 1887
- Language: English
- Headquarters: Sheffield
- Circulation: 5,764 (as of 2023)
- Sister newspapers: Doncaster Star, Sheffield Telegraph
- Website: thestar.co.uk

The Star, often known as the Sheffield Star, is a daily newspaper published in Sheffield, England, from Monday to Saturday each week. Originally a broadsheet, the newspaper became a tabloid in 1993. The Star, the weekly Sheffield Telegraph and the Green 'Un are published by Sheffield Newspapers Ltd (owned by National World), based at Cubo Work on Carver Street in Sheffield City Centre.

== History ==
The Star is marketed in South Yorkshire, North Derbyshire and North Nottinghamshire and reaches its readers through its main edition and district edition for Doncaster. The Rotherham and Barnsley district editions closed in 2008. The total average issue readership for The Star is 105,498.

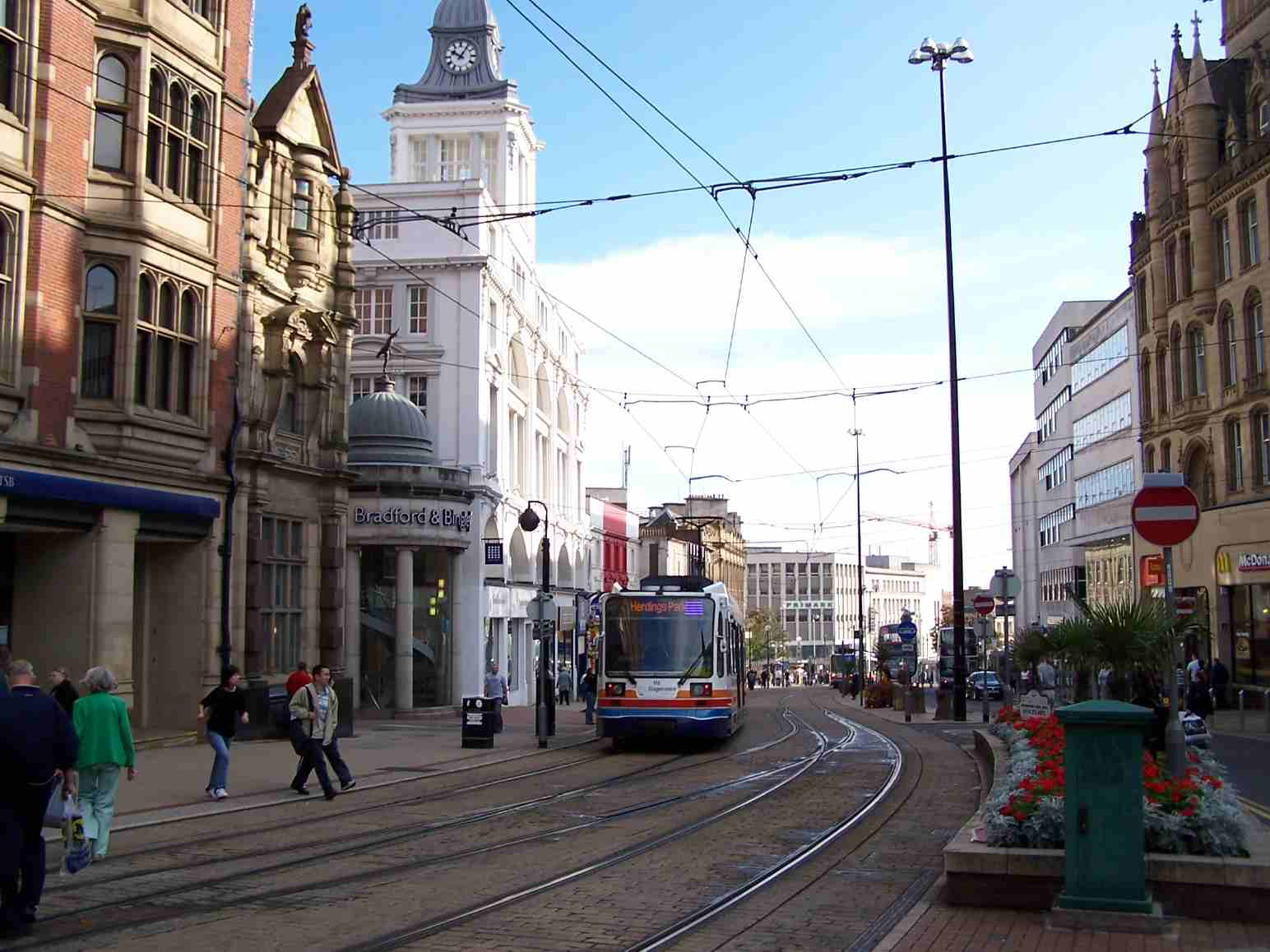
Looking down High Street from near its junction with Fargate, the Star and Telegraph building is on the left.

The newspaper which subsequently became The Star began as the Sheffield Evening Telegraph, the first edition of which was published on 7 June 1887.

It soon took over its only local rival, the Sheffield Evening Star, and from June 1888 to December 1897 it was known as the Evening Telegraph and Star and Sheffield Daily Times, then from 1898 to October 1937 as the Yorkshire Telegraph and Star.

In 1931, it took over the Sheffield Mail, which had been its main rival since 1920. From 1937 to November 1938, the newspaper became the Telegraph & Star, and finally, from 14 November 1938 was known as The Star.

In April 1989, the newspaper published false reports about the Hillsborough disaster which occurred in the city and in which 97 Liverpool F.C. fans were fatally injured at an FA Cup semi-final tie. It claimed that the key factor of the tragedy was the drunkenness of Liverpool fans. These claims were met with outrage by Liverpool fans, particularly when it was established that police loss of crowd control and the presence of perimeter fencing between the stands and the pitch were the key factors in the tragedy, although The Sun caused the most offence for its reporting on the event.

== Current operations ==
Johnston Press began printing The Star at their new £60 million printing plant in Dinnington, near Rotherham, in September 2006. The plant includes the first 'triple width' newspaper press in the UK. The plant also prints several other Johnston Press titles, including the Sheffield Telegraph, Scarborough Evening News, Wakefield Express, Derbyshire Times, and Chesterfield Advertiser, and a number of external publications, including The Sun and (for several years) the News of the World for News International.

In March 2011, The Star sports columnist and Features Editor Martin Smith received a top national award at the British Sports Journalism Awards. He was named Regional Sports Writer of the Year, for the third time in eight years, by the Sports Journalists' Association.

Nancy Fielder was made the editor of The Star in April 2016. James Mitchinson, Jeremy Clifford and John Furbisher held the position previously after Alan Powell retired in 2010. The current print editor is Charles Smith and the digital editor is Claire Lewis.

== Bibliography ==
- Bob Horton, Living in Sheffield: 1000 years of change
