= Mid-Ulster Mail =

Northern Irish newspaper

- Owner(s): National World
- Circulation: 448 (as of 2023)
- Website: northernirelandworld.com

The Mid-Ulster Mail is a newspaper based in Cookstown, County Tyrone, Northern Ireland. As well as serving Tyrone, it also covers Magherafelt, County Londonderry. It is published by National World. Current editor is Peter Bayne and reporters are Patricia Devlin, Stanley Campbell and Gillian Mc Dade.
