= Hastings & St Leonards Observer =

Local weekly newspaper published in Hastings, England

Hastings Observer
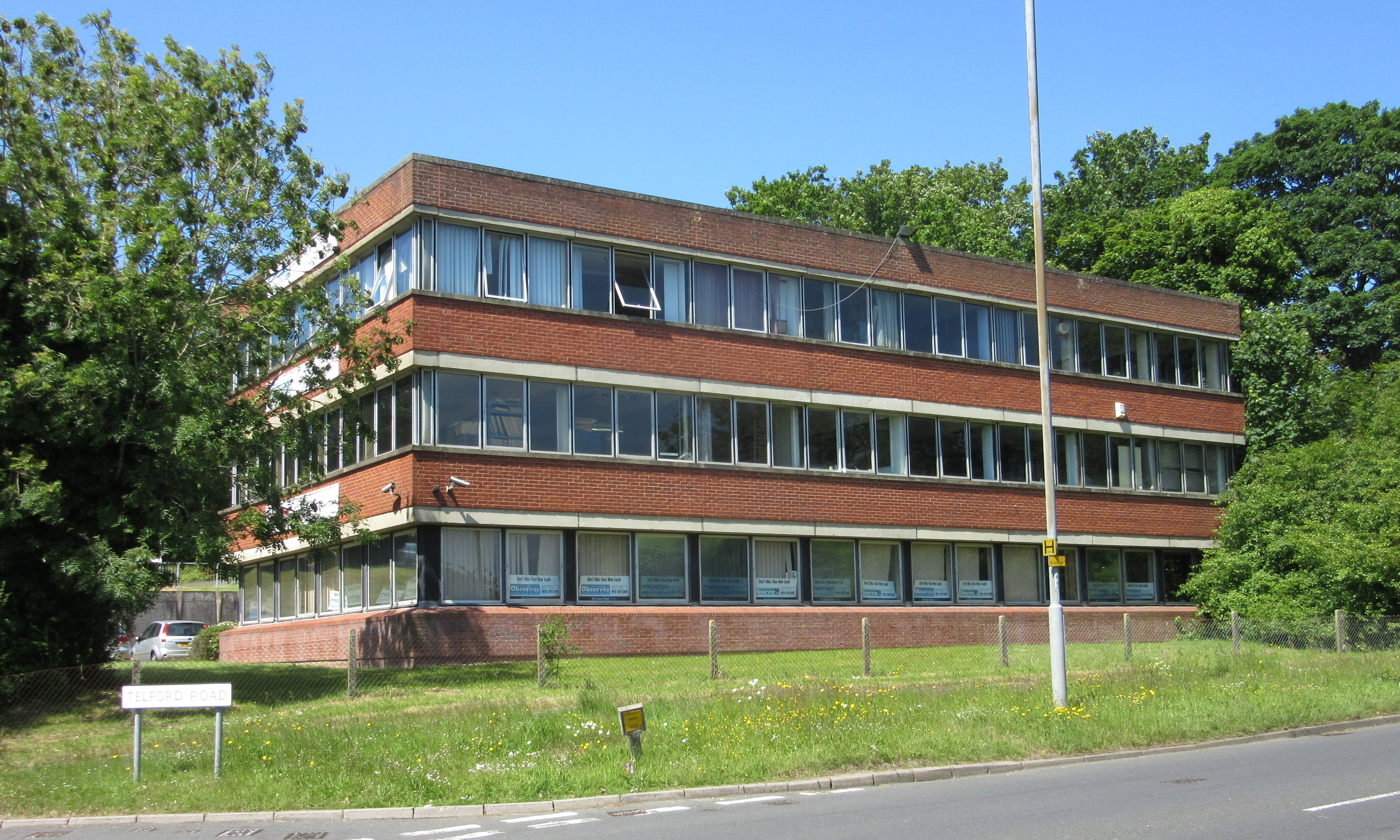
- Woods House, the former headquarters of the Hastings & St. Leonards Observer
- Type: Weekly newspaper
- Format: Tabloid
- Owner(s): National World
- Editor-in-chief: Gary Shipton
- Founded: 1859
- Language: English
- Headquarters: The Observer, Third Floor, Creative Media Centre, 45 Robertson Street, Hastings, TN34 1HL
- Circulation: 5,273 (as of 2023)
- Website: hastingsobserver.co.uk

The Hastings & St. Leonards Observer, commonly known as just the Hastings Observer, is an English weekly tabloid newspaper, published every Friday since 1859 in Hastings, East Sussex.

== History ==
First published in 1859, The Observer is the town's only weekly newspaper. Nowadays, the paper is edited and created by Sussex Newspapers, and printed by Johnston Press at their headquarters in Hilsea, Portsmouth. Prior to this, the paper was produced in a building purposely designed for the paper, the F.J. Parsons Printworks (Observer Building).
