= Coleraine Times =

Northern Irish newspaper

- Publisher: National World
- Headquarters: Coleraine, County Londonderry, Northern Ireland
- Circulation: 84 (as of 2023)
- ISSN: 1358-9350
- Website: colerainetimes.co.uk

The Coleraine Times is a newspaper based in Coleraine, County Londonderry, Northern Ireland. The paper was taken over by Johnston Press in 2005 and is now owned by National World.
