= The Scarborough News =

Newspaper in Scarborough, North Yorkshire, England

Scarborough News
- Type: Weekly newspaper
- Format: Tabloid
- Owner(s): National World
- Founded: 1882 as Scarborough Evening News
- Headquarters: Scarborough, England
- Circulation: 3,234 (as of 2023)
- ISSN: 0250-5150
- Website: thescarboroughnews.co.uk

The Scarborough News is a weekly newspaper distributed in and around the Scarborough area in North Yorkshire, England. It was launched on 31 May 2012 as a relaunch of the former daily newspaper, the Scarborough Evening News, and incorporates information from the former Saturday edition of the Filey & Hunmanby Mercury. It is a 'bumper' edition (136 pages), as news for seven days that was spread over six days (including the former Saturday Mercury edition) now has to be condensed into a weekly issue.

It is part of Yorkshire Regional Newspapers Ltd., which is owned by National World.

== History ==
The Scarborough Evening News was first published in 1882. At that time, the paper had a major rival in the Scarborough Daily Post, which had appeared six years earlier in 1876. The rivalry between the two newspapers continued up to 1921 when the Evening News bought the Daily Post.

The newspaper gave a local slant on the day's news, plus a look at headlines across the United Kingdom and the world. When first published, it was one of six newspapers serving the area.

Published six times a week Monday–Saturday, it served a 20-mile (30 km) radius of Scarborough, with a core radius of 12 miles (20 km). It was also available in Whitby, alongside the Whitby Gazette, and in many other towns and villages in the borough of Scarborough.

For many years, the Saturday edition of the newspaper was titled The Mercury.

In March 2006, the press at the Scarborough Evening News office in Scarborough was closed, ending printing in the town going back 150 years.

In May 2012 it was announced that the newspaper was to be re-launched as a weekly publication, along with three other Johnston Press regional newspapers, joining two dozen other titles across the country that had made the transition. The organisation has announced its plans to include extensive daily online publishing, coupled with iPad technology.

Editors: Ed Asquith (2003–2018), Paul Napier (2000–2003), David Penman (1993–2000), Neil Speight (1990–1993), John Bird (1986–1990), Ray Lazenby (1966–1986)

Awards – As The Scarborough Evening News: Yorkshire Regional Newspaper of Year 2003; The JP Best Daily Newspaper Sales Performance, and Community Initiative runner-up 2004; Yorkshire Press Awards Best Front Page runner-up 2005; Race for Life – national best media coverage 2005; Yorkshire Press Awards Campaign of the Year shortlisted 2006; Yorkshire Press Awards Highly commended Best Multi-Media News Story of the year 2008; Positive Images Children and Young People Now, award for Best Local Press coverage of Young People 2008; Yorkshire Press Awards Editorial Comment Writer of the Year – highly commended 2008; Yorkshire Press Awards Breaking News Story of the Year 2009; Annual Recognition Awards Yorkshire Air Ambulance: Media Award 2010; JP Best Daily to Weekly transition 2013.

As The Scarborough News: Commended Paper of Year Newspaper Awards 2013; Shortlisted Weekly Paper of Year Regional Press Awards 2014; Winner Yorkshire Weekly Newspaper of Year O2 Awards 2014; Finalist Yorkshire Weekly Newspaper of the Year O2 Awards 2015; Winner Yorkshire Weekly Newspaper of Year O2 Awards 2016; Commended Yorkshire Weekly Newspaper of Year O2 Awards 2017.

The long-serving editor of the paper, Ed Asquith, retired in June 2018. In October 2018, Johnston Press announced that it had put itself up for sale.
