= Portadown Times =

Northern Irish newspaper

- Type: Weekly newspaper
- Format: Tabloid
- Owner(s): National World
- Editor: Alistair Bushe
- Founded: 1920s
- Language: English
- Headquarters: Portadown, County Armagh
- Circulation: 1,048 (as of 2023)
- Website: portadowntimes.co.uk

The Portadown Times is a newspaper based in Portadown, County Armagh, Northern Ireland. It is published by National World.

== History ==
Founded in the 1920s, the Portadown Times was a poor second to the longer-established Portadown News, and - until it was taken over in the 1950s by James Morton, remained that way. Under Morton's expertise, it passed the News circulation and he took over the News in the early 1970s and ran both as a bi-weekly operation until he closed the Portadown News.

On Jim Morton's death, the Morton Newspaper Empire - which comprised around 22 titles in Northern Ireland, passed on to his son John who sold them to Scottish Radio, who consequently sold them on to Johnston Press.

The editor of the Portadown Times is Alistair Bushe who took over from David Armstrong who was in charge for more than 40 years. Alistair was appointed editor of the daily newspaper The News Letter. Clint Aiken is editing the Portadown Times.

In 2017, the Portadown Times joined the British Newspaper Archive.
