= Banbridge Chronicle =

North Ireland weekly newspaper

- Type: Tabloid
- Owner: National World
- Founder: Edward Hodgett Ltd
- Language: English
- Headquarters: 69a Newry Street, Banbridge, Down, BT32 3ED

The Banbridge Chronicle, formerly known as The Banbridge Chronicle, and Downshire Standard, is a weekly newspaper based in Banbridge, County Down, Northern Ireland. Established in 1874, it was originally known as The Banbridge Chronicle, Gilford & Rathfriland Mail. The newspaper, also referred to simply as The Chronicle, serves the surrounding Banbridge area, Gilford, Rathfriland, and South Down as a whole.

In 2023, The National World acquired the Banbridge Chronicle, 13 months after it being saved from going out of business by Bann Media in Scotland. Prior to the first buy-out, it was owned by the Hodgett family, and in 2021, they announced they would be forced to shut it down if a new buyer is not found. Following the purchase, the National World’s executive chairman David Montgomery said: “I first read the Chronicle as a schoolboy when visiting my uncle’s farm near Banbridge, so I know how valued it has always been in the community."
