= Ballymoney and Moyle Times =

Northern Irish newspaper

- Owner(s): National World
- Founded: 2000
- Circulation: 84 (as of 2023)
- Website: colerainetimes.co.uk

The Ballymoney and Moyle Times is a regional newspaper covering the north-east area of Northern Ireland. The paper is owned by National World.

It was first published in 2000.
