= Buckingham & Winslow Advertiser =

- Type: Weekly newspaper
- Format: Tabloid
- Owner(s): National World
- Founder(s): William Stallworthy
- Founded: 1853 (as The Buckingham Advertiser)
- Language: English
- Headquarters: Aylesbury, Buckinghamshire
- Circulation: 561 (as of 2023)
- Sister newspapers: Bucks Herald
- ISSN: 0962-7537
- Website: bucksherald.co.uk

The Buckingham & Winslow Advertiser is a weekly newspaper published in Aylesbury, Buckinghamshire, England, by National World. It covers the Buckingham and Winslow area. The editor is Hayley O'Keeffe. It is a member of the Independent Press Standards Organisation. It received its current name in 1984.

== History ==
The Buckingham Advertiser was founded in 1853 and published by William Stallworthy. In 1856 it was renamed The Buckingham Advertiser and Winslow and Brackley Record. In 1862 it was renamed again to Buckingham Advertiser and Free Press. By 1877 the paper was covering Buckinghamshire, Oxfordshire, Northamptonshire and Bedfordshire. In 1885 its then owner Joseph Scrivener Ladd changed the name to Buckingham Advertiser and North Bucks Free Press.
