= Chichester Observer =

Newspaper in West Sussex, England

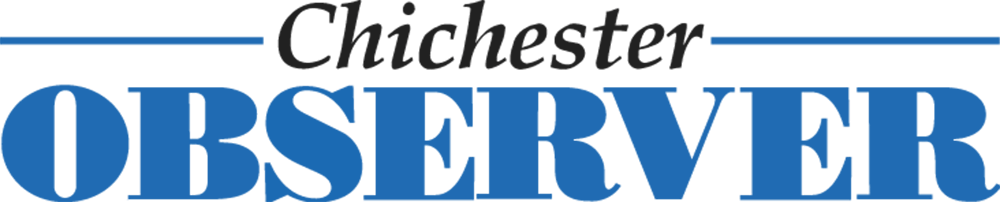
- Type: Weekly newspaper
- Owner: National World
- Editor-in-chief: Gary Shipton
- Deputy editor: Nicola Caines
- Founded: 15 June 1887; 138 years ago
- Language: English
- Headquarters: Chichester, West Sussex
- Country: United Kingdom
- Circulation: 6,275 (as of 2023)
- ISSN: 0963-3723
- OCLC number: 1001633504
- Website: Official website

The Chichester Observer is a British weekly newspaper reporting on Chichester and the surrounding area.

The newspaper is a member of the Independent Press Standards Organisation.

== History ==
The Chichester Observer and West Sussex Recorder published its first issue on 15 June 1887.

The newspaper was renamed the Chichester Observer in 1936.

In November 2018 the assets of Johnston Press, the Observer's then publisher, were acquired by JPI Media. In February 2022, the newspaper's online content was integrated into SussexWorld, a digital platform launched by owner National World that amalgamates coverage from 16 local titles, including the Sussex Express.

== See also ==
- JPIMedia
- Chichester, West Sussex
