= Carrick Times =

Northern Irish newspaper

- Type: Weekly newspaper
- Format: Tabloid
- Owner: National World
- Editor: Valerie Martin
- Founded: 1891
- Language: English
- Headquarters: Unit 1, Ledcom Industrial Estate, 100, Bank Rd, Larne BT40 3AW
- Website: northernirelandworld.com

The Carrick Times, (Formerly the Carrick Times and East Antrim Times) established in 1891, is a local weekly newspaper based in Carrickfergus, Northern Ireland. The newspaper serves communities of Carrickfergus, Greenisland, Larne, Whitehead and East Antrim as a whole. The newspaper is also known as the Carrickfergus Times on their website. The National World publishes the Carrick Times. It covers sport, culture, entertainment and local news and updates.
