= Fleetwood Weekly News =

Weekly newspaper

- Type: Weekly newspaper
- Owner: National World
- Editor: Jon Rhodes
- Founded: 1984
- Headquarters: Fleetwood Weekly News, 168 Lord St, Fleetwood
- Circulation: 326 (as of 2023)
- Website: fleetwoodtoday.co.uk

Fleetwood Weekly News is a weekly newspaper based in Fleetwood, Lancashire, England published every week, on a Wednesday, which covers Fleetwood and North Fylde.

The newspaper is published by Blackpool Gazette & Herald Ltd who also publish the daily Blackpool Gazette and the weekly Lytham St. Annes Express. All three are owned by National World.
