= Lurgan Mail =

Northern Irish newspaper

- Type: Weekly newspaper
- Owner(s): National World
- Founder(s): Lewis Robert Richardson
- Founded: 1889
- Circulation: 322 (as of 2023)
- Website: northernirelandworld.com

The Lurgan Mail was founded in 1889 by Lewis Robert Richardson. The Lurgan Mail is a tabloid weekly newspaper based in Lurgan, County Armagh in Northern Ireland. It is published on Wednesday evenings, though each edition always bears the Thursday date and reports not only news in Lurgan, but also in nearby towns such as Waringstown and others in Craigavon Borough area. It is operated by National World, who owns many of titles across Ireland and the United Kingdom.
