= Ulster Star =

Northern Irish newspaper

- Owner: National World
- Circulation: 222 (as of 2023)
- Website: northernirelandworld.com

The Ulster Star is a newspaper based in Lisburn, County Antrim, Northern Ireland. It is published by National World. Among its photographers were John Kelly, who died in 2019.
