= West Lothian Herald & Post =

The West Lothian Herald & Post was a weekly Scottish freesheet that delivered to households in Livingston, Linlithgow, Bathgate, Broxburn and surrounding areas from 1988 to 2012.

It consisted mainly of advertising and promotional pieces, with some editorial relating to local news and sport. It had a circulation of 48,000 and was owned by Johnston Press, which owns The Scotsman and Edinburgh Evening News.
