= Fife Herald & Post =

Fife Herald
- Owner(s): National World
- Circulation: 1,387 (as of 2023)
- Website: fifetoday.co.uk

The Fife Herald & Post is a weekly Scottish freesheet that delivers to households in Dunfermline, Kirkcaldy, Cowdenbeath, Inverkeithing and surrounding areas. The paper used to be called the Dunfermline Herald & Post.

It consists mainly of advertising and promotional pieces, with some editorial relating to local news and sport. It has a circulation of 46,000 and is owned by Johnston Press, which also owns The Scotsman and Edinburgh Evening News.
