= Daventry Express =

- Type: Weekly newspaper
- Format: Tabloid
- Owner(s): National World
- Editor: Jason Gibbins
- Language: English
- Headquarters: High Street; Daventry; NN11 4BQ
- Circulation: 423 (as of 2023)
- Website: daventryexpress.co.uk

The Daventry Express is a local weekly newspaper serving Daventry and the surrounding villages. It is published every Thursday and is owned by National World.

== History ==
In 1869 the Daventry Express was published on Saturdays by Thomas and John William Barrett. The newspaper was discontinued in 1940, at a time of national paper shortages, but was revived in 1948 under the title Daventry and District Weekly Express, shortened to Daventry Weekly Express in 1966, and again to Daventry Express in 1990.

== See also ==
- List of newspapers in the United Kingdom
