= Dewsbury Reporter =

British local newspaper

- Type: Weekly newspaper
- Publisher: National World
- Founded: 1858; 167 years ago
- Circulation: 2,738 (as of 2023)
- Website: dewsburyreporter.co.uk

The Dewsbury Reporter is a local weekly publication, providing news for residents of Dewsbury, West Yorkshire, and surrounding areas.

It is owned by National World, and has sister newspapers covering Mirfield, Wakefield, Batley and Birstall. The Dewsbury Reporter was the second newspaper in Dewsbury, having been founded in 1858 four years after the Dewsbury and Batley Herald.

== History ==
The Dewsbury Reporter was founded in 1858, and celebrated its 150th birthday on 7 March 2008. It was owned by the Huddersfield Examiner.

The paper was Yorkshire Weekly Newspaper of the Year in 2003 and 2009 and is part of the Yorkshire Weekly Newspaper Group.

In July 2008, Hannah Ridgeway replaced Richard Firth as the newspaper's editor after previously working on the Halifax Courier and as deputy editor on the Brighouse Echo.
