= Larne Times =

Northern Irish newspaper

- Type: Weekly newspaper
- Owner(s): National World
- Founded: 1891
- Circulation: 1,000 (as of 2023)
- Website: northernirelandworld.com

The Larne Times is a weekly newspaper based in Larne, County Antrim, Northern Ireland. The paper was taken over by Johnston Press in 2005 from Scottish Radio Holdings and is now operated by National World.

In 1891 it was founded as The Larne Times and Weekly Telegraph and in 1936 became simply Larne Times.

In 2016, Johnston Press still considered it to be one of its core titles.
