= Littlehampton Gazette =

Local newspaper in Littlehampton, England

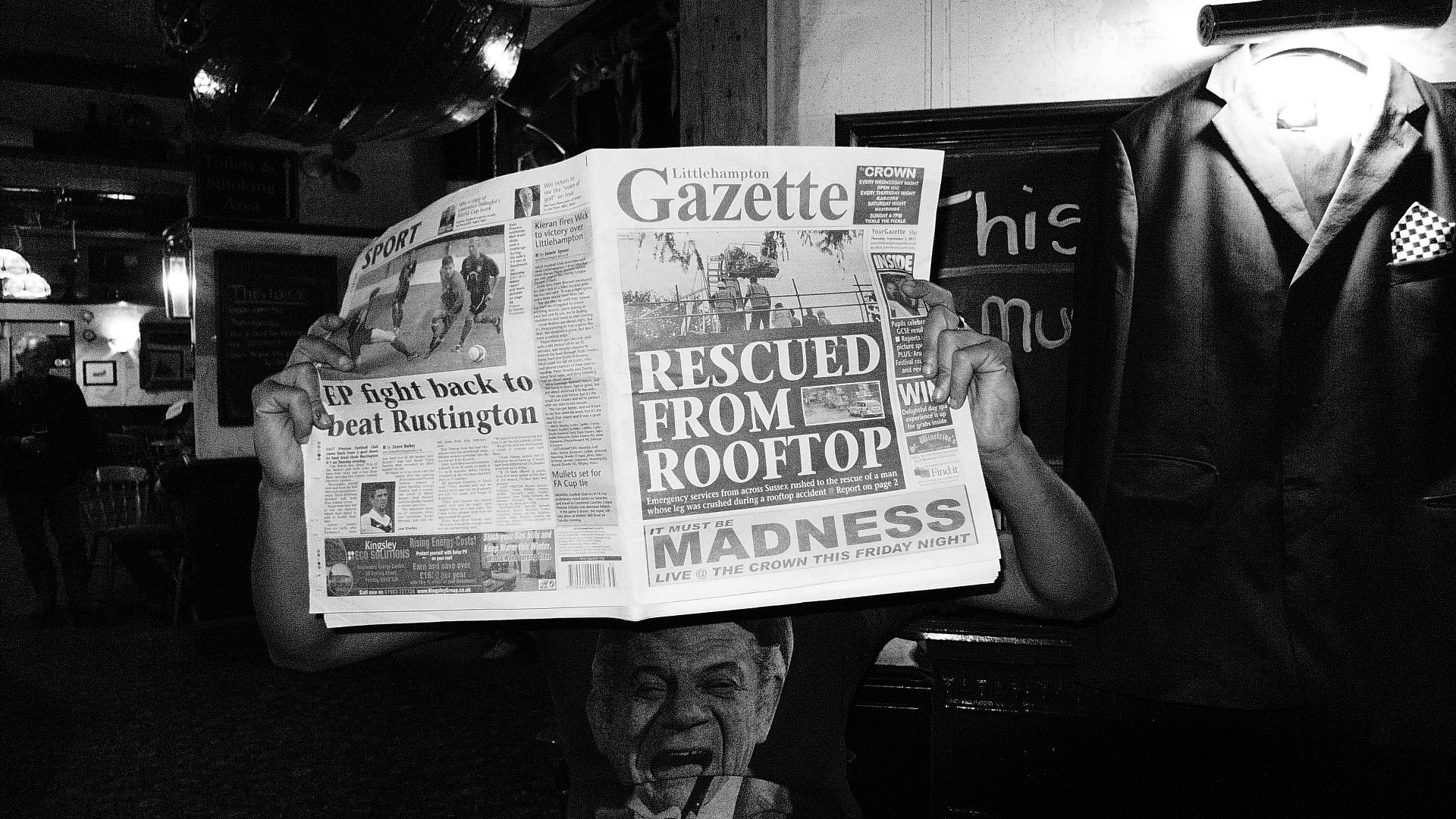

The Littlehampton Gazette is a British local newspaper, serving the West Sussex town of Littlehampton and surrounding towns and villages such as Angmering, Arundel, Clapham, East Preston, Patching and Rustington. It is a weekly newspaper published on Thursdays, and has been published since 1893, although from 1977 until 1990 it was renamed the Arun Gazette.

It is owned by JPIMedia Ltd, and is a sister paper to the Worthing Herald. The Gazette's main offices are located with the Herald in nearby Worthing, with an office in Littlehampton itself. Among the important stories the paper has covered is the murder of Sarah Payne and the subsequent trial of her killer in 2000 and 2001.
