= Mid Sussex Times =

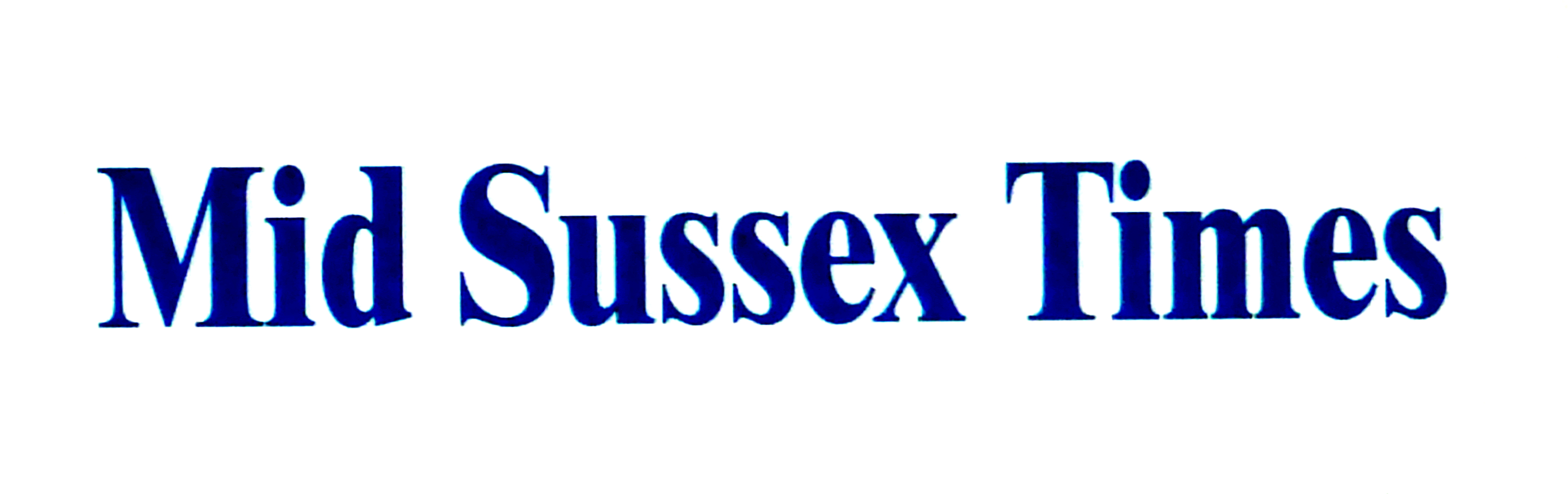
- Current masthead
- Type: Weekly newspaper
- Format: Tabloid
- Owner: National World
- Editor: Gary Shipton
- Founded: 1881
- Language: English
- Headquarters: Freedom Works Metro House, Northgate, Chichester, PO19 1BE
- Circulation: 1,868 (as of 2023)
- Website: midsussextimes.co.uk

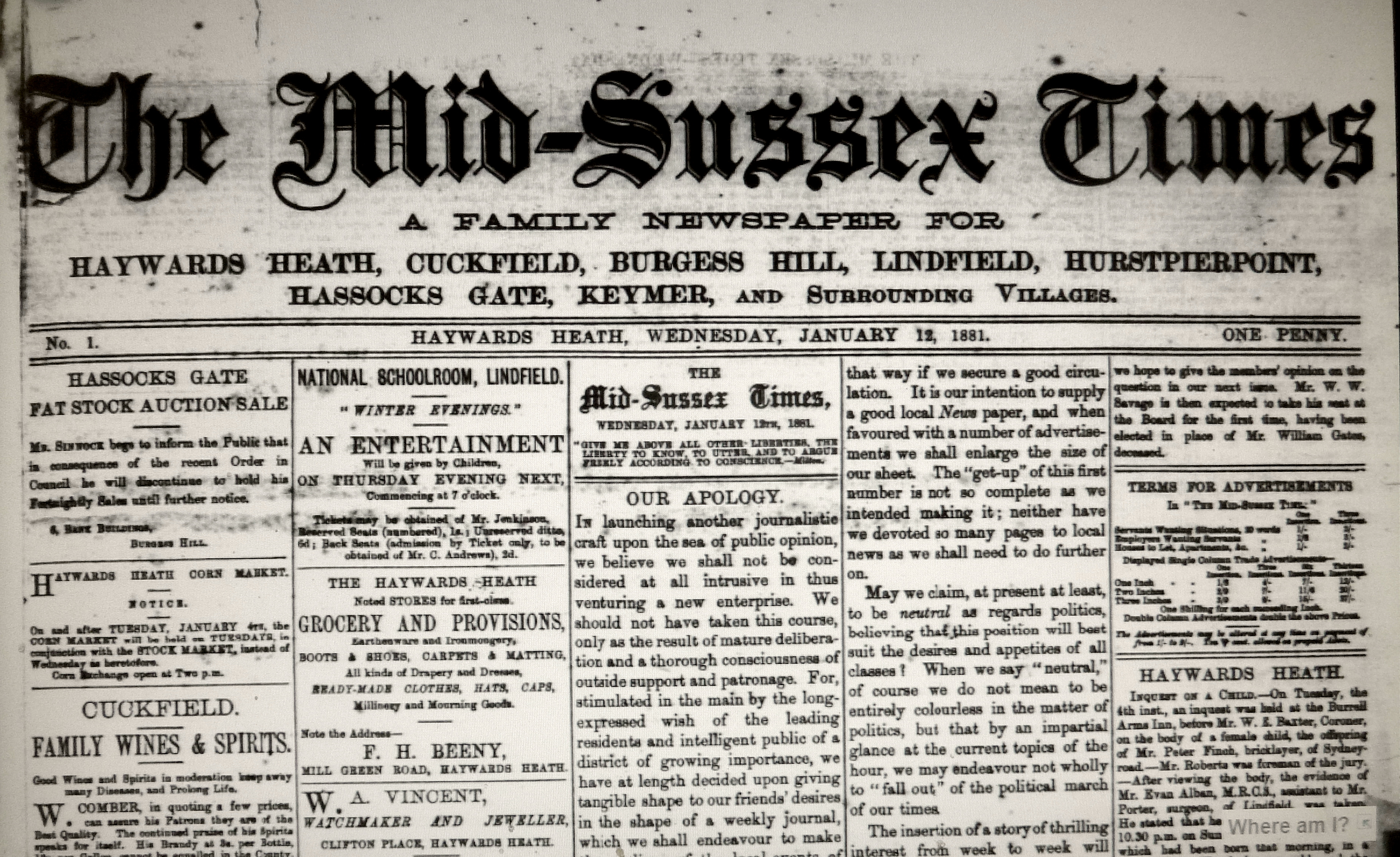
First front page, 1881

The Mid Sussex Times is a local weekly paper for the region of Mid Sussex in West Sussex, England, that also covers news from the localities of East Sussex. The two major towns served by the paper are Burgess Hill and Haywards Heath, including news from and around the surrounding parishes of Cuckfield, Lindfield, Hassocks, Chailey, and as far north as Forest Row.

The newspaper, often nicknamed as The Middy, has been in circulation since 1881, and in 2006 celebrated its 125th anniversary. The newspaper headquarters are in Northgate, Chichester, after the company left its office at 7-9 South Road, Haywards Heath. For several years the paper ran a yearly 'Best Baby Award'.

The circulation of the paper in 2010 was 11,416 but is believed to have fallen significantly since. For many years, together with the Thursday release, there was also published a weekly paper called The Mid Sussex Citizen, which was available free in most of the region's corner shops and village stores, repeating the main headlines published in that week's Mid Sussex Times, yet also including a grand array of advertising for people wishing to sell and buy goods in the area. This publication has since been discontinued.
