= Whitby Gazette =

English provincial newspaper

- Type: Weekly newspaper
- Format: Tabloid
- Owner(s): National World
- Founder(s): Ralph Horne
- Editor: Ed Asquith
- Founded: 1854
- Political alignment: Impartial
- Headquarters: Whitby, England
- Circulation: 1,937 (as of 2023)
- ISSN: 0963-4649
- Website: whitbygazette.co.uk

The Whitby Gazette is an English provincial newspaper published in Whitby, North Yorkshire.

== History ==
The Whitby Gazette was founded on 6 July 1854 by Ralph Horne, a local printer, bookseller, stationer, bookbinder, paperhanger and shipowner, who was also a member of the Whitby Literary and Philosophical Society. It was originally published as the Whitby Gazette: Horne's List of Visitors, and was little more than a list of visitors to the seaside town. However, on 2 January 1858, it became a proper twice-weekly newspaper, published on Tuesday and Friday each week.

On the death of Ralph Horne in 1892, his two sons, H. S. "Mr Harry" Horne and F. W. "Mr Fred" Horne had taken over as Editor and Chairman respectively. In 1920, "Mr Harry" Horne retired and one of "Mr Fred" Horne's sons, William Mackenzie Horne, took over the editorship between the wars. In 1949, "Mr Fred" Horne died thereby relinquishing the Chairmanship, and William Mackenzie's son, L. M. "Mr Lionel" Horne, took over the running of the entire business. The Gazette stopped being privately owned by the Horne family on 30 March 1978, when Lionel Horne, the great grandson of Ralph Horne, died.

The Gazette briefly experimented with a paywall, but this was quickly abandoned as the number of subscribers remained low. The Gazette was re-launched as weekly edition in January 2012 and the paper is now published on a Friday. It is published by Yorkshire Regional Newspapers Ltd, part of Johnston Press.

Editor: Ed Asquith Editorial Director since 2003 (previously editor 1996-1998)

The Whitby Gazette is the only newspaper in the world to have been read on the highest mountain on each of the seven continents, thanks to the efforts of mountaineer Alistair Sutcliffe, who lives in a village near to the seaside port.

Lewis Carroll's first ever published literary works, Coronach and the Lady of the Ladle, were published in the Whitby Gazette between 1854 and 1856.

== Awards ==
In 2011 the editorial team was a finalist in the O2 Media Awards for the Yorkshire and Humber. In 2013 the Gazette was nominated for the 02 Media's Weekly Newspaper of the Year award. In 2014 the newspaper was also JP Weekly Paper of the Year Runner-up. Winner Yorkshire best weekly newspaper O2 Awards winner 2017
