= List of newspapers in the United Kingdom =

Twelve daily newspapers and eleven Sunday-only weekly newspapers are distributed nationally in the United Kingdom. Others circulate in Scotland only and still others serve smaller areas. National daily newspapers publish every day except Sundays and 25 December. Sunday newspapers may be independent; e.g. The Observer is an independent Sunday newspaper without a daily sister paper, but more commonly, they have the same owners as one of the daily newspapers, usually with a related name (e.g. The Times and The Sunday Times), but are editorially distinct.

UK newspapers can generally be split into two distinct categories: the more serious and intellectual newspapers, usually referred to as the broadsheets, and sometimes known collectively as the "quality press", and others, generally known as tabloids, and collectively as the 'popular press', which have tended to focus more on celebrity coverage and human interest stories rather than political reporting or overseas news. The tabloids in turn have been divided into the more sensationalist mass market titles, or 'red tops', such as The Sun and the Daily Mirror, and the middle-market papers, the Daily Express and the Daily Mail.

Most of the broadsheets, so called because of their historically larger size, have changed in recent years to a compact format, the same size as the tabloids. The Independent and The Times were the first to do so. The Guardian moved in September 2005 to what is described as a 'Berliner' format, slightly larger than a compact. Its then Sunday stablemate The Observer followed suit. Both The Guardian and The Observer now use the tabloid format, having done so since January 2018. Despite these format changes, these newspapers are all still considered 'broadsheets'.

Other Sunday broadsheets, including The Sunday Times, which tend to have a large amount of supplementary sections, have kept their larger-sized format. The national Sunday titles usually have a different layout and style from their weekday sister papers, and are produced by separate journalistic and editorial staff.

All the major UK newspapers currently have websites, some of which provide free access. The Times and The Sunday Times have a paywall requiring payment on a per-day or per-month basis by non-subscribers. The Financial Times business daily also has limited access for non-subscribers. The Independent became available online only upon its last printed edition on 26 March 2016. However, unlike the previously mentioned newspapers, it does not require any payment to access its news content. Instead the newspaper offers extras for those wishing to sign up to a payment subscription, such as crosswords, Sudoku puzzles, weekend supplements and the ability to automatically download each daily edition to read offline. The London Economic is another example of a British digital/online only newspaper; however, unlike The Independent it has never run a print publication.

Most towns and cities in the UK have at least one local newspaper, such as the Evening Post in Bristol and The Echo in Cardiff. Local newspapers were listed in advertising guides such as the Mitchell's Press Directories.

They are not known nationally for their journalism in the way that (despite much syndication) some city-based newspapers in the USA are (e.g. The New York Times, The Washington Post, The Boston Globe, Los Angeles Times). An exception to this was the Manchester Guardian, which shortened its name to The Guardian in 1959 and relocated its main operations to London in 1964. The Guardian Media Group produced a Mancunian paper, the Manchester Evening News, until 2010 when along with its other local newspapers in the Greater Manchester area it was sold to Trinity Mirror.

== Broadsheet and former broadsheet newspapers ==
Title	Days of publication	Circulation	Established	Editor	Owner	Political orientation	Political party support in the 2024 general election	Format
The Sunday Times	Sundays	647,622 (Note: For March 2020. For further details see List of newspapers in the United Kingdom by circulation)	1821	Ben Taylor	News Corporation	Centre-right	Labour Party	Broadsheet
The Times	Daily	365,880	1785	Tony Gallagher	News Corporation	Centre-right	None	Compact
The Daily Telegraph	Daily	317,819 (Note: For December 2019. For further details see List of newspapers in the United Kingdom by circulation)	1855	Chris Evans	Press Holdings (Barclay twins)	Right-wing	Conservative Party	Broadsheet
The Sunday Telegraph	Sundays	248,288	1961	Allister Heath	Press Holdings (Barclay twins)	Right-wing	Conservative Party	Broadsheet
The Observer	Sundays	136,656	1791	Paul Webster	Tortoise Media	Centre-left	Labour Party	Compact
The i Paper	Daily	131,562	2010	Oliver Duff	Daily Mail and General Trust	Non-partisan	None	Compact
The Guardian	Daily	105,134	1821	Katharine Viner	Scott Trust Limited's Guardian Media Group	Centre-left	Labour Party	Compact
iWeekend	Saturdays	N/A (Note: Only online.)	2017	Oliver Duff	Daily Mail and General Trust	Non-partisan	None	Compact
The Independent	N/A	N/A	1986	Geordie Greig	Sultan Muhammad Abuljadayel; Alexander Lebedev; Evgeny Lebedev	Centrist	Labour Party	Online only
Financial Times	Daily	106,038	1888	Roula Khalaf	Nikkei Inc.	Centre to centre-right	Labour Party	Broadsheet

== Tabloid newspapers ==
Title	Days of publication	Circulation	Established	Editor	Owner	Political orientation	Political party support in the 2024 general election
The Sun	Daily	1,210,915	1964	Victoria Newton	News Corporation	Right-wing	Labour Party
The Sun on Sunday	Sundays	1,013,777	2012	Victoria Newton	News Corporation	Right-wing	None
Daily Mail	Daily	745,629	1896	Ted Verity	Daily Mail and General Trust	Right-wing	Conservative Party
The Mail on Sunday	Sundays	637,877	1982	David Dillon	Daily Mail and General Trust	Right-wing	Conservative Party
Daily Express	Daily	163,610	1900	Gary Jones	Reach plc	Right-wing	Conservative Party
Sunday Express	Sundays	163,610	1918	Michael Booker	Reach plc	Right-wing	Conservative Party
Daily Mirror	Daily	258,043	1903	Lloyd Embley	Reach plc	Centre-left	Labour Party
Sunday Mirror	Sundays	193,360	1915	Lloyd Embley	Reach plc	Centre-left	Labour Party
Sunday People	Sundays	65,460	1881	Peter Willis	Reach plc	Centre-left	Labour Party
Daily Star	Daily	146,949	1978	Jon Clark	Reach plc	Largely non-political	Count Binface
Daily Star Sunday	Sundays	87,798	2002	Denis Mann	Reach plc	Largely non-political	None
Morning Star	Daily	N/A	1930	Ben Chacko	People's Press Printing Society	Left-wing	None

== Freesheet newspapers in urban centres ==
Title	Days of publication	Circulation	Format	Established	Editor	Owner	Political orientation	Distribution	Political party support in the 2024 general election
Metro	Weekdays	951,684	Tabloid	1999	Ted Young	Daily Mail and General Trust plc	Largely non-political	Wide availability in the major cities	None
City A.M.	Tuesday to Thursday (mornings)	67,600	Tabloid	2005	Andy Silvester	City A.M. Ltd	Centre-right	Wide availability in the major cities	None
London Standard	Weekly	302,602	Tabloid	1827	Dylan Jones	Alexander Lebedev; Lord Rothermere	Centre-right	Greater London	Labour Party
The Shuttle	Weekly	10,152	Tabloid	1870	Peter John	Newsquest Media Group	N/A	Wyre Forest area of Worcestershire	None
Asian Express	Weekly	N/A	Tabloid	1999	N/A	Media Buzz Ltd	N/A	Wide availability in the major cities	None
Yorkshire Reporter	Monthly	N/A	Tabloid	2013	N/A	Pick up Publications Ltd	N/A	Widely available in Leeds and its surrounding areas	None

== Street newspapers ==
Title	Days of publication	Circulation	Established	Owner	Distribution
The Big Issue	Weekly	57,059	September 1991	The Big Issue	UK-wide

== Major news and political magazines ==
Title	Established	Editor	Owner	Political orientation
New Statesman	1913	Thomas McTague	Mike Danson	Centre-left
The Spectator	1828	Michael Gove	Paul Marshall	Right-wing
Prospect	1995	Philip Collins	Prospect Publishing Ltd	Centre-left
The Economist	1843	Zanny Minton Beddoes	The Economist Group	Centre
Tribune	1937	Oliver Eagleton	Tribune Media Group	Left-wing
The Week	1995	Caroline Law	Dennis Publishing	Centre
Private Eye	1961	Ian Hislop	Pressdram Ltd	None

== Newspapers in England ==
=== Regional newspapers in England ===
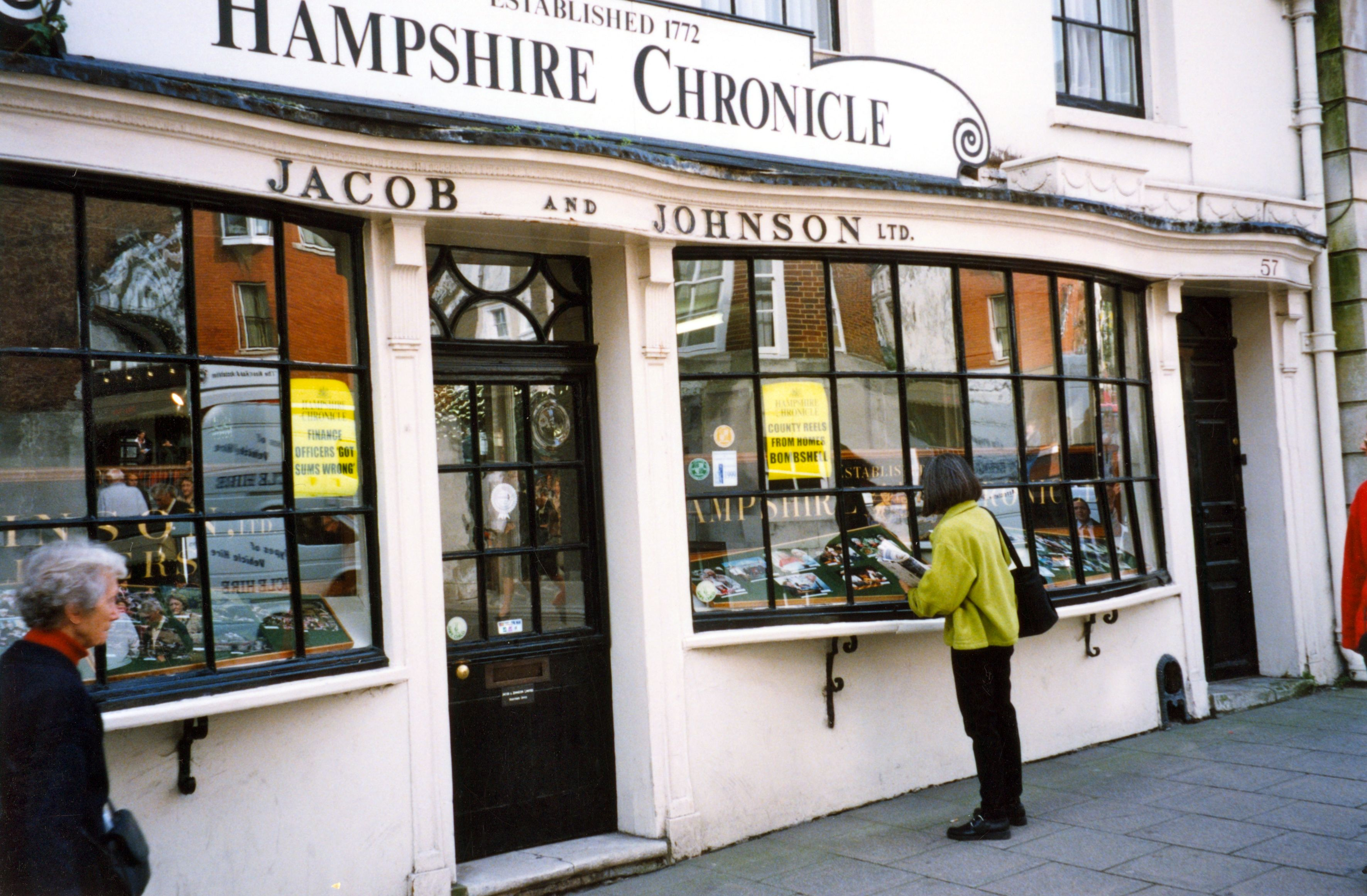
Exterior of Hampshire Chronicle office, 1999

- Aintree & Maghull Champion (weekly free newspaper)
- Anfield & Walton Champion (weekly free newspaper)
- The Argus (Brighton & Hove and Sussex)
- Ashford Herald
- The Asian Today (Midlands) (owned by Urban Media)
- The Bath Chronicle
- Berwick Advertiser
- The Beverley Life (free monthly newspaper)
- Birkenhead News (Merseyside & Chester)
- Birmingham Mail
- Birmingham Post
- Bishop's Stortford Independent
- Bolton News
- Bootle Champion (weekly free newspaper)
- Bournemouth Daily Echo
- Bradford Telegraph & Argus
- Bridlington Echo (free monthly newspaper)
- Bucks Free Press
- Business Up North
- Cambridge Independent
- Cambridge News
- Camden Gazette
- Camden New Journal
- Chad (Mansfield and Ashfield)
- The Champion (Southport)
- The Citizen
- The Comet (Stevenage)
- Congleton Chronicle
- Cornish Guardian
- The Cornishman
- The Cotswold Journal
- Coventry Telegraph
- Crosby & Litherland Champion (weekly free newspaper)
- Cumberland and Westmorland Herald
- The Cumberland News
- Deal and Sandwich Express
- Dearne Valley Weekender (Est. 1988 by D Matthews. Free weekly)
- Derby Telegraph
- Dover Express
- Dover Mercury
- Droitwich Advertiser
- Dudley News
- "Easingwold Advertiser"
- East Anglian Daily Times (owned by Archant)
- East Kent Gazette
- East Kent Mercury
- East Riding Mail
- Eastern Daily Press (owned by Archant)
- Essex Chronicle
- Express and Echo (Exeter and the surrounding area)
- Express & Star (Wolverhampton and the Black Country)
- Folkestone Herald
- Formby Champion (weekly free newspaper)
- Gravesend and Dartford Reporter
- Grimsby Telegraph
- Halesowen News
- Hampstead & Highgate Express ("Ham and High")
- Hampshire Chronicle
- Hastings Observer
- Helston Advertiser (weekly free newspaper)
- Herald Express
- Hereford Times
- Herts Advertiser
- Herne Bay Gazette
- Huddersfield Daily Examiner
- Hull Daily Mail
- Ilford Recorder
- Investor Times
- Isle of Wight County Press
- The Journal (Newcastle upon Tyne)
- Kent and Sussex Courier
- Kent on Saturday
- Kent Messenger
- Kentish Express
- Kentish Gazette
- Kidderminster Shuttle
- Lancashire Evening Post
- Lancashire Telegraph
- The Leveller (free newspaper for Somerset)
- Leicester Mercury
- Leybourne Voice
- Lincolnshire Echo
- Liverpool Echo
- The Liverpool Post
- London Evening Standard
- Lynn News
- Manchester Evening News
- The Mercury (Lichfield, Tamworth and surrounding area)
- Mid Devon Advertiser, Newton Abbot and surrounding areas
- Mid Sussex Times
- Midweek Herald (weekly free newspaper for East Devon) (owned by Archant)
- The Mill (Manchester)
- Mule (Manchester)
- Newcastle Evening Chronicle
- Newcastle Sunday Sun
- News and Star
- Northampton Chronicle & Echo
- The Northern Echo (North East England)
- Northumberland Gazette (Northumberland)
- Norwich Evening News
- North Norfolk News
- Nottingham Evening Post
- Oldham Chronicle
- Ormskirk Advertiser
- Ormskirk & West Lancs Champion (weekly free newspaper)
- Oxford Mail
- Oxford Times
- Patterdale Chronicle
- Peterborough Evening Telegraph
- Plymouth Herald
- Plymouth Chronicle
- The Poole Observer (digital daily newspaper)
- The Post, Bristol
- The Press (York)
- Reading Chronicle
- The Rotherham Advertiser
- Ripon Gazette
- Romney Marsh Herald
- Salford Advertiser
- Salford City Reporter
- Salisbury Journal
- Scunthorpe Telegraph
- The Sentinel (Stoke-on-Trent and Staffordshire)
- Sevenoaks Chronicle
- Sheerness Times Guardian
- Sheffield Star
- The Sheffield Tribune
- Shropshire Star
- Skelmersdale Champion (weekly free newspaper)
- Slough Observer
- Southern Daily Echo
- Southport Champion (weekly free newspaper)
- Southport Reporter
- Southport Visiter
- Star Courier Hampshire and Surrey
- Stockport Express and Times, Stockport and district
- Stray Ferret
- Stroud News and Journal
- Stourbridge News
- Sunderland Echo
- Surrey Advertiser
- Tavistock Times Gazette
- Teesdale Mercury
- Teesside Gazette
- Teme Valley Times
- Warwickshire Telegraph
- Watford Observer
- The West Briton
- Western Daily Press
- Western Morning News
- Whitstable Gazette
- Wigan Observer
- Wirral Globe
- Wolds Weekly
- Wythenshawe World
- Yorkshire Post
- Yorkshire Reporter

=== Local newspapers in England ===
- Abingdon
  - Abingdon Herald
- Accrington
  - Accrington Observer
- Alnwick
  - Northumberland Gazette
- Alton
  - Alton Herald
  - The Argus
- Andover, Hampshire (also covers Tidworth and Whitchurch, Hampshire)
  - Andover Advertiser
- Ascot
  - Bracknell & Ascot Times
- Ashford, Kent
  - Ashford Herald
  - Kentish Express
  - yourashford
- Axminster
  - Pulmans Weekly News
  - View From Axminster (weekly, free)
- Aylesbury
  - Bucks Herald
- Banbury
  - Banbury Guardian
- Barnsley
  - Barnsley Chronicle
  - The Independent
  - The Star
- Barrow-in-Furness
  - North West Evening Mail
- Basildon
  - Basildon Yellow Advertiser
  - The Evening Echo
- Basingstoke
  - Basingstoke Gazette
  - Basingstoke Observer
- Bedfordshire
  - Times & Citizen
- Bexhill
  - Bexhill News
- Bicester
  - Bicester Advertiser
  - Bicester Review
- Birmingham
  - Birmingham Post (weekly)
  - Evening Mail (daily)
  - Forward, formerly the Birmingham Voice (published 20 times a year by Birmingham City Council)
  - Sports Argus (now just a pull out in the Birmingham Mail)
  - Sunday Mercury (Sunday mornings)
- Blackpool
  - Blackpool Gazette
- Bolton
  - Bolton News
  - LivingINBL
- Bootle
  - Bootle Champion, part of the award-winning Champion newspaper series in Sefton and West Lancashire
- Boston, Lincolnshire
  - Boston Standard
  - Boston Target
- Bourne, Lincolnshire
  - Bourne Local
- Bourne, Lincolnshire/Market Deeping, Lincolnshire and Rutland
  - Stamford Mercury
- Bournemouth, Dorset
  - The Poole Observer
- Bracknell
  - Bracknell News
  - Bracknell Midweek
  - Bracknell Standard
- Bradford
  - The Bradfordian
- Braintree, Essex
  - Braintree and Witham Times
- Brentwood
  - Brentwood Gazette
- Bridgwater (Somerset)
  - "Bridgwater Mercury"
- Bridlington
  - Bridlington Free Press
- Bridport (Dorset)
  - The Bridport News
- Brighouse
  - Brighouse Echo (weekly, Thursdays)
- Brighton
  - The Argus (formerly Brighton Evening Argus)
- Bristol
  - Bristol Post (formerly Bristol Evening Post)
  - The Bristol Cable (quarterly, free)
- Bromsgrove
  - Bromsgrove Standard
  - Bromsgrove Advertiser
- Bromyard
  - Teme Valley Times
- Buckingham
  - The Advertiser
- Bude (Cornwall)
  - Bude & Stratton Post
- Burnley
  - Burnley Express
- Burton-upon-Trent
  - Burton Mail
- Bury
  - Bury Times
- Bury St. Edmunds
  - Bury Free Press
- Buxton
  - Buxton Advertiser
- Cambridge
  - Cambridge Independent
  - Cambridge News
- Camelford (Cornwall)
  - Camelford & Delabole Post
- Canterbury
  - Canterbury Times
  - Kentish Gazette
- Canvey Island
  - The Evening Echo
  - The Canvey and Benfleet Times
- Carlisle
  - News and Star (daily except Fridays and Sundays)
  - Cumberland News (Fridays)
  - Cumbrian Gazette (weekly; free)
- Chesham
  - Bucks Examiner (weekly)
- Cheshunt
  - Cheshunt (and Waltham Cross) Mercury
- Chester
  - Chester and District Standard (weekly; free)
  - Chester Chronicle (weekly)
  - Chester Evening Leader
  - Chester Mail (weekly; free)
- Chesterfield
  - Advertiser
  - Derbyshire Times
  - Express
- Chew Valley
  - Chew Valley Gazette
- Chichester
  - Chichester Observer
- Chorley
  - Chorley Citizen (weekly; free)
  - Chorley Guardian (weekly)
- Cirencester
  - The Wilts & Gloucestershire Standard (weekly, established 1837)
- Cleobury Mortimer
  - Teme Valley Times
- Coalville
  - Coalville Times (weekly; also edition in Ashby de la Zouch and Swadlincote)
- Colchester
  - Essex County Standard
  - Evening Gazette
- Congleton
  - Congleton Chronicle
- Cotswolds
  - Cotswold Journal
- Coventry
  - Coventry Advertiser (monthly; free)
  - Coventry Telegraph (daily)
- Crawley
  - Crawley News
  - Crawley Observer
- Crewe
  - Crewe Chronicle (weekly)
  - Crewe Guardian (weekly, free)
  - South Cheshire Mail (weekly, free)
- Croydon
  - Croydon Advertiser (weekly, also editions in NE Surrey)
  - Croydon Guardian (weekly, free)
  - Croydon Post (weekly, free)
- Daventry
  - Daventry Express (weekly)
- Deal
  - Deal and Sandwich Express
  - East Kent Mercury
  - yourdeal
- Dartford
  - "Dartford Living" (monthly; free)
  - Kent Messenger
- Derby
  - Derby Evening Telegraph
  - Derby Express (weekly; free)
- Dewsbury
  - Dewsbury Reporter
- Diss, Norfolk
  - Diss Express
- Doncaster
  - Doncaster Free Press
- Dover
  - Dover Express
  - Dover Mercury
  - yourdover
- Driffield
  - Driffield and Wolds Weekly
- Droitwich
  - Droitwich Standard
- Dudley
  - Dudley News (weekly)
  - Express and Star (Dudley version of the Wolverhampton newspaper)
- Durham
  - Darlington & Stockton Times
  - Durham Times
  - Teesdale Mercury
  - Wear Valley Mercury
- Easingwold
  - Easingwold Advertiser
- East Northamptonshire
  - "Nene Valley News"
- Eastbourne
  - Eastbourne Gazette
  - Eastbourne Herald
- Evesham
  - Evesham Journal
- Exeter
  - Express and Echo
  - Flying Post
- Exmouth
  - Exmouth Journal
- Farnborough
  - Farnborough News
  - Star Courier
- Farnham
  - Farnham Herald
- Faversham
  - Faversham News
  - Faversham Times
  - yourswale
- Fleetwood
  - Fleetwood Weekly News
- Folkestone
  - Folkestone Herald
  - Kentish Express
  - yourshepway
- Formby
  - Formby Visitor
  - Formby Reporter
  - Formby Champion
- Furness
  - North-West Evening Mail
- Gainsborough
  - Gainsborough Standard
- Garstang
  - Garstang Courier
- Glossop
  - Glossop Advertisers
  - Glossop Chronicle
  - Glossop Gazette
- Gloucestershire
  - The Forester
  - Gloucester Citizen
  - Gloucestershire Echo
  - Stroud Life
- Goole
  - Goole, Howden, Thorne Courier (owned by Johnston Press)
  - Goole Times
- Grantham
  - Grantham Journal
- Gravesend
  - Gravesend Messenger
  - The Reporter, formerly The Gravesend Reporter (Archant)
- Great Yarmouth
  - Great Yarmouth Mercury (Archant)
- Grimsby and Northern Lincolnshire
  - Grimsby Telegraph
- Guildford
  - Surrey Advertiser
- Hailsham
  - Hailsham News
- Halifax
  - Halifax Evening Courier
- Harlow
  - Harlow Scene
  - Harlow Star
  - The Herald
  - The Mercury
- Harrogate
  - Harrogate Advertiser
- Hartlepool
  - Hartlepool Mail
- Hastings
  - Hastings & St. Leonards Observer
  - Hastings Independent Press
- Hebden Bridge
  - Hebden Bridge Times
- Hemel Hempstead
  - Hemel Hempstead Gazette
  - Herald Express
- Henley-on-Thames
  - Henley Standard
- Hereford
  - Hereford Times
- Herne Bay
  - Herne Bay Gazette
  - Herne Bay Times
- Hertford
  - Hertfordshire Mercury
- Hertfordshire
  - Herts Advertiser
  - Hertfordshire Mercury
  - St Albans Observer
  - Watford Observer
  - Welwyn Hatfield Times
- Heywood
  - Heywood Advertiser
- Hexham
  - Hexham Courant
- Holsworthy (Devon)
  - Holsworthy Post
- Honiton (Devon)
  - Midweek Herald
  - View from Honiton
- Horsham
  - The Resident (weekly; free)
- Hucknall
  - Hucknall and Bulwell Dispatch
- Huddersfield
  - Colne Valley Chronicle
  - Huddersfield & District Chronicle
  - Huddersfield Daily Examiner
  - Huddersfield Weekly News (free)
- Hythe, Kent
  - Hythe Herald
  - Kentish Express
  - yourshepway
- Ilkley
  - Ilkley Gazette
- Ipswich
  - Evening Star (owned by Archant)
- Isle of Sheppey
  - Sheerness Times Guardian
  - Sheppey Gazette
  - yourswale
- Isle of Wight
  - Isle of Wight County Press
  - Wight Insight (journal of Isle of Wight Council)
- Keighley
  - Keighley News
- Kendal
  - Westmorland Gazette
- King's Lynn
  - The Citizen (weekly, free)
  - Lynn News & Advertiser (Tuesdays and Fridays)
  - Your Local Paper
- Kingston upon Hull
  - Hull Daily Mail
  - The Hull Story (monthly; free)
- Kingston upon Thames
  - Kingston Guardian
  - Surrey Comet
- Knutsford
  - Knutsford Guardian
- Lancaster
  - Lancaster Guardian
- Langport
  - The Leveller
- Launceston (Cornwall)
  - Cornish & Devon Post
- Leeds
  - Leeds Express
  - Yorkshire Evening Post
  - Yorkshire Post
  - The Yorkshire Reporter
- Leek
  - Leek Post and Times
  - Your Leek Paper
- Leicester
  - Leicester Mercury
  - Leicester Advertiser (monthly; free)
- Leigh, Greater Manchester
  - Leigh Journal
  - Leigh Reporter
- Leominster
  - Teme Valley Times
- Leyland
  - Leyland Guardian (weekly)
- Lichfield
  - Lichfield Mercury
- Liverpool
  - Liverpool Echo
  - Mersey Reporter
- London – see List of newspapers in London for a more complete list
  - Barking & Dagenham Recorder
  - Barking & Dagenham Yellow Advertiser
  - Bexley Mercury
  - Bexley Times
  - Brent & Wembley Leader
  - Brixton Bugle
  - Camden Gazette
  - Camden New Journal
  - Croydon Advertiser
  - Croydon Guardian
  - Croydon Post
  - Ealing Gazette
  - Ealing Leader
  - Ealing Informer
  - East London Advertiser
  - Enfield Advertiser
  - Enfield Gazette
  - Evening Standard (free since late 2009, published by Daily Mail and General Trust plc)
  - Fulham & Hammersmith Chronicle
  - Greenwich Visitor
  - Hackney Gazette
  - Hammersmith & Kensington Times
  - Hampstead and Highgate Express
  - Haringey Advertiser
  - Harrow & Wembley Observer
  - Harrow Informer
  - Harrow Leader
  - Havering Yellow Advertiser (Romford)
  - The Hillingdon Herald
  - Hornsey & Crouch End Journal
  - Hounslow Borough Chronicle
  - Hounslow, Chiswick & Whitton Informer
  - Ilford & Redbridge Yellow Advertiser
  - Ilford Recorder
  - Islington Gazette
  - Kensington, Chelsea and Westminster Today
  - Kensington & Chelsea Informer
  - Kilburn Times
  - Kingston Guardian
  - Lewisham & Greenwich Mercury
  - London Lite (free, published by Daily Mail and General Trust plc)
  - The Londoner, free, published by the Mayor of London
  - Metro (free, published by Daily Mail and General Trust plc)
  - Mitcham, Morden & Wimbledon Post
  - Muswell Hill Journal
  - Newham Recorder
  - Paddington & Westminster Times
  - The Press (Barnet and Hendon)
  - Richmond and Twickenham Times
  - Romford Recorder
  - South London Press (Dulwich, Southwark, and Streatham)
  - Southwark News ([Southwark])https://www.southwarknews.co.uk/
  - Staines Informer
  - Staines Leader
  - Stratford & Newham Express
  - Streatham, Clapham & West Norwood Post
  - Surrey Comet (covering the Royal borough of Kingston)
  - Surrey Herald
  - Surrey Mirror Advertiser
  - Sutton & Epsom Post
  - Sutton Guardian
  - Tottenham, Wood Green and Edmonton Journal
  - Uxbridge & Hillingdon Leader
  - Uxbridge Gazette
  - Waltham Forest News
  - Wanstead and Woodford Guardian
  - Wembley & Kingsbury Times
  - The Wharf (Canary Wharf)
  - Wharf Life (Canary Wharf)
  - Willesden & Brent Times
- Loughborough
  - Loughborough Echo
  - Loughborough Mail
  - Loughborough Trader Xtra
- Loughton
  - Loughton Guardian (part of the Newsquest group)
- Ludlow
  - Ludlow Advertiser (weekly)
  - Teme Valley Times
- Luton
  - Herald and Post
  - Luton on Sunday
- Lyme Regis
  - View From Lyme Regis (weekly, free)
- Macclesfield
  - The Macclesfield Express
  - The Macclesfield Times
- Maidenhead
  - Maidenhead Advertiser
- Maidstone
  - Kent Messenger
  - yourmaidstone
- Malton
  - Malton Gazette & Herald (weekly)
- Malvern
  - Malvern Gazette
- Manchester
  - Manchester Evening News
  - South Manchester Reporter
- Mansfield
  - Chad (Chronicle Advertiser)
- Market Drayton
  - Market Drayton Advertiser
- Market Harborough
  - Harborough Mail
- Market Rasen
  - Market Rasen Mail
- Medway
  - Medway Messenger
  - Medway Standard
  - yourmedway
- Melton Mowbray
  - Melton Times
- Middlesbrough
  - The Gazette
- Middleton, Greater Manchester
  - Middleton Guardian
- Milton Keynes
  - Milton Keynes Citizen
  - OneMK
- Minehead
  - West Somerset Free Press
- Morecambe
  - The Visitor
- Newark
  - Newark Advertiser
- Newbury
  - Newbury Weekly News
- Newcastle upon Tyne
  - Chronicle Extra (free weekly newspaper, for all of Newcastle)
  - Evening Chronicle
  - The Journal
  - Metro (free, Newcastle edition, published by Daily Mail and General Trust plc)
  - Sunday Sun
- Newquay
  - Newquay Voice
- New Romney
  - Kentish Express
  - Romney Marsh Herald
  - yourshepway
- Newton Abbot
  - Mid Devon Advertiser
- Newtownabbey
  - Newtownabbey Times
- Northampton
  - Northampton Chronicle & Echo
  - Northampton Mercury
- Northwich
  - Northwich Guardian
- North Yorkshire
  - The Advertiser (free)
  - North Yorkshire News (free)
- Norwich
  - The Advertiser (Archant) (weekly, free)
  - Norwich Evening News (daily)
- Nottinghamshire
  - Newark Advertiser
  - Nottingham Evening Post
  - Worksop Guardian
- Oldham
  - Oldham Advertiser
  - Oldham Evening Chronicle
- Ormskirk
  - Ormskirk and West Lancashire Advertiser
  - Ormskirk and West Lancashire Champion
- Oswestry
  - Oswestry and Border Counties Advertizer
- Oxford
  - Oxford Mail
  - Oxford Star
  - Oxford Times
- Penrith
  - Cumberland and Westmorland Herald (Saturdays)
- Peterborough
  - Peterborough Evening Telegraph (daily, part of East Midlands Newspapers Ltd., owned by Johnston Press Plc)
- Peterlee
  - Peterlee Star (weekly)
- Pickering
  - Pickering Gazette & Herald (weekly)
- Plymouth
  - Plymouth Evening Herald
  - Western Morning News
  - Plymouth Chronicle
- Portsmouth
  - The News
  - Sports Mail (weekly, football)
- Prestwich
  - Prestwich and Whitefield Guide
- Rayleigh
  - The Rayleigh Times
- Reading
  - Reading Chronicle
- Retford
  - Retford Times
  - Retford Trader and Guardian
- Ripon
  - Ripon Gazette
- Rochdale
  - Rochdale Observer
- Romsey
  - Romsey Advertiser
- Ross-on-Wye
  - Ross Gazette
- Rotherham
  - Rotherham Advertiser
- Royston
  - Royston Crow
- Rugby
  - Rugby Advertiser (weekly)
  - Rugby Observer (weekly; free)
- St Austell
  - St Austell Voice
- St. Helens
  - St Helens Reporter
  - St Helens Star
- St Ives
  - St Ives Times & Echo
- Salford
  - Salford Advertiser
- Sandwich
  - Deal and Sandwich Express
  - East Kent Mercury
  - yoursandwich
- Scarborough
  - The Scarborough News (weekly), previously Scarborough Evening News (daily)
  - Scarborough Mercury, later The Mercury (weekly)
- Scunthorpe
  - Scunthorpe Telegraph
- Selby
  - Selby Post
  - Selby Star
  - Selby Times
- Seaford, East Sussex
  - Seaford Gazette
- Sevenoaks
  - Sevenoaks Chronicle
- Sheffield
  - Sheffield Star
- Shrewsbury
  - Shrewsbury Chronicle
- Sittingbourne
  - East Kent Gazette
- Skipton
  - Craven Herald & Pioneer
- Sleaford
  - Sleaford Standard
  - Sleaford Target
- Solent Hampshire
  - Solent Times
- Slough
  - Slough Express
- Somerset
  - The Leveller
- South Tyneside
  - Shields Gazette (the oldest provincial evening newspaper in the United Kingdom)
- Southend
  - The Evening Echo
- Southport
  - Southport Champion
  - Southport Reporter
  - Southport Visiter
- Stafford
  - Stafford & Stone Chronicle
- Stamford and Rutland
  - Stamford Mercury
- Stockport
  - Stockport Express
- Stoke-on-Trent
  - The Sentinel
- Stourbridge
  - Stourbridge Chronicle
  - Stourbridge News
- Stowmarket
  - Stowmarket Mercury
- Stratford-upon-Avon
  - Stratford Herald
  - Stratford Observer
- Stroud
  - Stroud News and Journal
- Sunderland
  - Sunderland Echo
- Sutton Coldfield
  - Sutton Coldfield Observer
- Swindon
  - Swindon Advertiser
  - Swindon Star
- Tameside (metropolitan borough of Greater Manchester)
  - Tameside Advertiser
  - Tameside Reporter
- Tamworth
  - Tamworth Herald
- Taunton
  - The Somerset County Gazette (weekly; focus chiefly on Taunton)
  - The Taunton Times (weekly; free)
- Tenbury Wells
  - Teme Valley Times
- Tenterden
  - Kentish Express
  - yourashford
- Isle of Thanet
  - Isle of Thanet Gazette
  - Thanet Adscene
  - Thanet Extra
  - Thanet Times
  - yourthanet
- Todmorden
  - Todmorden News
- Torbay (and South Devon)
  - Herald Express
  - Torbay Times Community Newspaper
- Vale of Belvoir
  - Melton Times
  - The Village Voice (monthly; free)
- Wakefield
  - Wakefield Express
  - Wakefield Express Extra (weekly; free)
  - Pontefract and Castleford Express
- Walton
  - Walton News & Mail (weekly)
- Warminster
  - Warminster Journal
- Warrington
  - Warrington Guardian
  - Warrington Worldwide
- Wetherby
  - Wetherby News
- Whitby
  - Whitby Gazette (weekly)
- Whitchurch, Shropshire
  - Whitchurch Herald
- Whitstable
  - Whitstable Gazette
  - Whitstable Times
- Widnes
  - Widnes Weekly News (weekly)
  - Widnes World (weekly)
- Wigan
  - Wigan Evening Post
  - Wigan Observer
  - Wigan Reporter
- Wiltshire
  - Gazette and Herald
  - "Wiltshire Star" (weekly; free)
  - Wiltshire Times
- Winchester
  - Winchester Today
- Wirral
  - Birkenhead News (Merseyside & Chester)
  - Wirral Globe
  - Wirral News (editions for Wallasey, Birkenhead, Hoylake & West Kirby, Heswall, Bromborough) (Defunct)
- Wisbech
  - Wisbech Standard
- Wokingham
  - The Wokingham Paper
- Wolverhampton
  - Express and Star (covering the whole of the Black Country, this is the biggest-selling regional evening newspaper in the UK)
- Worcester
  - Berrow's Worcester Journal (part of the Newsquest group)
  - Worcester News (part of the Newsquest group)
- Worcestershire
  - Kidderminster Shuttle (weekly; free)
- Worksop
  - Worksop Guardian
  - Worksop Trader
- Wymondham and Attleborough (Norfolk)
  - Wymondham and Attleborough Mercury
- Yeovil
  - Western Gazette
- York
  - York Press

== Newspapers in Northern Ireland ==
Title	Market type	Print time	Political alignment	Format	Circulation
The Belfast Telegraph	Regional	Morning	British Unionist - Liberal	Compact	35,931
The Irish News	Regional	Morning	Irish Nationalist	Compact	33,647
The News Letter	Regional	Morning	British Unionist - Conservative	Tabloid	13,374

=== Local newspapers ===
- Belfast
  - Andersonstown News
  - Belfast News
  - North Belfast News
  - South Belfast News
- County Antrim
  - Antrim Guardian
  - Ballycastle Chronicle
  - Ballymena Guardian
  - Ballymoney Chronicle
  - Lisburn Standard
  - Newtownabbey Times
  - Ulster Star
- County Armagh
  - Armagh Observer
  - Lurgan Mail
  - Portadown Times
  - Ulster Gazette
- County Down
  - County Down Outlook
  - County Down Spectator
  - Down Recorder
  - The Mourne Observer
  - Newry Reporter
  - Newtownards Chronicle
- County Fermanagh
  - Fermanagh Herald
  - The Impartial Reporter
- County Londonderry
  - Coleraine Chronicle
  - The Coleraine Leader
  - County Derry Post
  - Derry Journal
  - Derry News
  - Limavady Chronicle
  - Londonderry Sentinel
  - Mid Ulster Mail
  - Mid Ulster Observer
  - Limavady Northern Constitution
  - Northern Constitution
- County Tyrone
  - Mid Ulster Mail
  - Mid Ulster Observer
  - Tyrone Constitution
  - Tyrone Courier
  - Strabane Chronicle
  - Strabane Weekly News and Tyrone & Donegal Reporter
  - Tyrone Herald
  - Ulster Herald

== Newspapers in Scotland ==
=== Daily newspapers ===
Title	Market type	Print time	Location	Format	Scottish circulation
The Herald	National – Quality	Morning	Scottish	Broadsheet	47,020
The Scotsman	National – Quality	Morning	Scottish	Compact	38,423
The National	National – Mid Market	Morning	Scottish	Compact	2,986
Daily Record	National – Tabloid	Morning	Scottish	Tabloid	275,175
The Courier	Regional	Morning	Scottish	Compact	61,981
The Press and Journal	Regional	Morning	Scottish	Compact	71,044
Greenock Telegraph	Local	Morning	Scottish	Tabloid	14,342
Paisley Daily Express	Local	Morning	Scottish	Tabloid	7,538
Edinburgh Evening News	Local	Evening	Scottish	Tabloid	39,947
Evening Express	Local	Evening	Scottish	Tabloid	47,849
Evening Telegraph	Local	Evening	Scottish	Tabloid	23,631
Evening Times	Local	Evening	Scottish	Tabloid	52,400
The Daily Telegraph (Scottish edition)	National – Quality	Morning	Scottish edition of UK Newspaper	Broadsheet	22,172
The Times (Scottish edition)	National – Quality	Morning	Scottish edition of UK Newspaper	Compact	19,994
Scottish Daily Express	National – Mid Market	Morning	Scottish edition of UK Newspaper	Tabloid	65,689
Scottish Daily Mail	National – Mid Market	Morning	Scottish edition of UK Newspaper	Tabloid	109,643
Daily Star of Scotland	National – Tabloid	Morning	Scottish edition of UK Newspaper	Tabloid	65,084
Scottish Daily Mirror	National – Tabloid	Morning	Scottish edition of UK Newspaper	Tabloid	24,333
The Scottish Sun	National – Tabloid	Morning	Scottish edition of UK Newspaper	Tabloid	314,595
The Financial Times	National – Quality	Morning	UK Newspaper widely available in Scotland	Broadsheet	3,528
The Guardian	National – Quality	Morning	UK Newspaper widely available in Scotland	Berliner	14,069
i	National – Quality	Morning	UK Newspaper widely available in Scotland	Compact	12,411
Metro, Scottish Edition	Urban – Free	Morning	Scottish edition of UK Newspaper	Tabloid	125,002

=== Sunday newspapers ===
Title	Market type	Location	Format	Scottish circulation
Scotland on Sunday	National – Quality	Scottish	Broadsheet	50,897
Sunday Mail	National – Tabloid	Scottish	Tabloid	354,396
The Sunday Post	National – Tabloid	Scottish	Tabloid	224,471
The Sunday Times Scotland	National – Quality	Scottish edition of UK Newspaper	Broadsheet	59,502
The Sunday Telegraph Scotland	National – Quality	Scottish edition of UK Newspaper	Broadsheet	18,339
Mail on Sunday Scotland	National – Mid Market	Scottish edition of UK Newspaper	Tabloid	105,223
Scottish Sunday Express	National – Mid Market	Scottish edition of UK Newspaper	Tabloid	35,337
Scottish Sunday Mirror	National – Tabloid	Scottish edition of UK Newspaper	Tabloid	21,809
The Observer	National – Quality	UK Newspaper widely available in Scotland	Berliner	17,880
The Independent on Sunday	National – Quality	UK Newspaper widely available in Scotland	Compact	6,317
Daily Star Sunday	National – Tabloid	UK Newspaper widely available in Scotland	Tabloid	26,889
The Sunday Sport	National – Tabloid	UK Newspaper widely available in Scotland	Tabloid	n/a

== Newspapers in Wales ==
=== National newspapers ===
- Bylines Cymru – owned by Byline Times
- The Western Mail – owned by Reach plc
- Y Cymro (monthly, Welsh language)
- Wales on Sunday - sister publication of The Western Mail

=== Regional daily newspapers ===
- North Wales Daily Post
- South Wales Argus (Gwent area)
- South Wales Echo (Cardiff area)
- South Wales Evening Post (Swansea Bay area)
- The Leader (Wrexham & Flintshire)

=== Regional newspapers ===
- Abergavenny Chronicle
- Abergele Visitor
- Bangor and Anglesey Mail
- Brecon and Radnor Express
- Business Lancashire
- Business Manchester
- Business Merseyside
- Business Cheshire
- Caernarfon Herald
- Caerphilly Observer
- Cambrian News
- Carmarthen Journal
- Celtic Weekly Newspapers
- Denbighshire Visitor
- Flintshire Chronicle
- Glamorgan Star
- Holyhead and Anglesey Mail
- Llanelli Star
- Monmouthshire Beacon
- North Wales Weekly News
- The Pembrokeshire Herald
- The Powys County Times
- Pembrokeshire (North) County Echo
- Rhyl Visitor
- Tenby Observer
- The Western Telegraph
- Wrexham Chronicle

=== Papurau Bro ===
Papurau Bro ('Area Papers') are Welsh language newspapers produced nominally monthly (typically 10 issues a year with a summer break) which cover the news in a small area - a town, group of parishes, one or a few valleys, etc. - with a circulation of perhaps a few thousand each. There are between 50 and 60 Papurau Bro which cover the whole of Wales, plus the Welsh communities of Liverpool and London. Papers are frequently named after local features, connections, crafts, etc., or in dialect (clebran, clecs, clochdar, and clonc; all imply 'gossip'). The first papur bro (Y Dinesydd) appeared in 1973 in Cardiff, and the following decade saw the establishment of most of the others. Much of the work of producing the papers is done voluntarily (aside from the printing), although financial support is given by Bwrdd yr Iaith (Welsh Language Board). Some of the papers listed may have ceased publication.

- Yr Angor (The Anchor) – Aberystwyth, Comins Coch, Llanbadarn Fawr, Penparcau and Waunfawr
- Yr Angor – Merseyside Welsh Community
- Yr Arwydd (The Signal) – Bodafon mountain area, Anglesey
- Y Barcud (The Kite) – Tregaron and District, Ceredigion
- Y Bedol (The Horseshoe) – Ruthin and District, Denbighshire
- Y Bigwn (The Thorn) – Denbigh
- Y Blewyn Glas (The Blue Grass) – Dyfi valley, Machynlleth, Powys
- Y Cardi Bach (The Little Cardi) – Whitland, Carmarthenshire
- Y Clawdd (The Dyke) – a reference to Offa's Dyke – Wrexham and District
- Clebran (The Tattler) – Y Frenni
- Clecs Y Cwm A'r Dref (Valley and Town Gossip) – Neath and District
- Clochdar (Cackle) – Cynon Valley, Aberdare, Rhondda Cynon Taf
- Clonc (Gossip) – Lampeter and District
- Cwlwm (The Knot) – Carmarthen
- Dail Dysynni (Leaves of the Dysynni) – Dysynni valley, Tywyn, Gwynedd
- Y Ddolen (The Link) – Ystwyth to Wyre valleys, Aberystwyth, Ceredigion
- Y Dinesydd (The Citizen) – Cardiff and District
- Y Dydd (The Day) – Dolgellau, Gwynedd
- Eco'r Wyddfa (The Snowdon Echo) – Llanrug, Llanberis and Llanddeiniolen parishes, Gwynedd
- Y Fan A'r Lle – Brecon and District
- Y Ffynnon (The Spring) – Eifionydd, Garndolbenmaen, Gwynedd
- Y Gadlas (The Barnyard) – The district between the Conwy and Clwyd valleys
- Y Gambo (The Horse-cart) – Southwest Ceredigion
- Y Garthen (The Coverlet) – Teifi valley, Ceredigion
- Y Glannau (The Riverbanks) – Lower Vale of Clwyd, St Asaph.
- Glo Mân (Small Coal) – Aman valley, Carmarthenshire
- Y Glorian (The Scales) – Top of the Rhondda valley, Tonpentre, Rhondda
- Y Glorian – Llangefni, Anglesey
- Goriad (The Key) – Bangor and Port Dinorwic
- Yr Hogwr (The Sharpener) – Bridgend area
- Llafar Bro (Area Speech) – Blaenau Ffestiniog and District, Gwynedd
- Llais (The Voice) – Tawe valley, Swansea
- Llais Aeron (The Voice of Aeron) – Aeron valley, Ceredigion
- Llais Ardudwy (The Voice of Ardudwy) – Ardudwy, Gwynedd
- Llais Ogwan (The Voice of Ogwen) – Ogwen valley, Bethesda, Gwynedd
- Llanw Llŷn (The Flow of Llŷn (postcode area)) – Llŷn Peninsula, Pwllheli, Gwynedd
- Lleu – Dyffryn Nantlle, Caernarfon
- Y Llien Gwyn (The White Sheet) – Fishguard and District, Pembrokeshire
- Y Lloffwr (The Gleaner) – Dinefwr area, Carmarthen
- Nene – Ponciau, Penycae, Johnstown and Rhosllannerchrugog, Wrexham
- Yr Odyn (The Kiln) – Conwy valley, Llanrwst, Conwy
- Papur Fama (Moel Famau mountain Paper) – Mold and District, Flintshire
- Papur Menai (The Menai Paper) – Menai strait east of Penmon, Anglesey
- Papur Pawb (Everybody's Paper) – Talybont, Taliesin, Tre'r Ddol, Ceredigion
- Papur Y Cwm (The Valley Paper) – Gwendraeth valley, Llanelli, Carmarthenshire
- Y Pentan (The Ingle-nook) – Conwy Valley and estuary
- Pethe Penllyn (Penllyn Things) – five parishes of Penllyn, Bala, Gwynedd
- Plu'r Gweunydd (Cotton Grass) – Y Foel, Llangadfan, Llanerfyl, Llanfair Caereinion, Adfa, Cefn Coch, Llwydiarth, Llangynyw, Dolanog, Rhiwhiraeth, Pontrobert, Meifod and Welshpool, Powys
- Y Rhwyd (The Net) – North West Anglesey
- Seren Hafren (The Star of the Severn) – Severn Valley, Newtown, Powys
- Tafod-Elai (The Tongue of the Ely) – Taff Ely, Cardiff
- Tafod Tafwys (The Tongue of the Thames) – for Welsh learners in London
- Y Tincer (The Tinker) – Mouths of the Glyn, Llangorwen, Tirymynach, Tremeurig and Borth valleys, Aberystwyth, Ceredigion
- Tua'r Goleuni (Towards the Light) – Rhymney valley, Caerphilly
- Wilia – Swansea and District
- Yr Wylan (The Seagull) – Penrhyndeudraeth, Porthmadog, Beddgelert and District, Gwynedd
- Yr Ysgub (The Wheatsheaf) – Ceiriog, Tanat and Cain valleys, Powys

== Non-English-language newspapers ==
Several newspapers in languages other than English are published in Britain, for immigrant and expatriate readers. Newspapers, both national and local, in Arabic, Bulgarian, Bangla, Italian, Korean, Latvian, Polish, Portuguese, Urdu, and other languages are published.

Title	Published	Language	Audience
BG Ben	Fortnightly	Bulgarian	Bulgarian newspaper for people living in UK
Hanin Herald	Weekly	Korean	Newspaper for the Korean community in the UK and abroad
Tydzień Polski	Weekly	Polish	Newspaper aimed at Britain's Polish community
Cooltura	Weekly	Polish	Most popular magazine for the Polish community in the UK
Goniec Polski Polish Weekly Magazine	Weekly	Polish	Magazine for the Polish community in the UK
Polish Express	Weekly	Polish	Tabloid magazine for the Polish Community in the UK
Nowy Czas	Fortnightly	Polish	Magazine for educated Polish people living in UK
Sing Tao	Daily	Chinese	Newspaper aimed at Britain's and Europe's Chinese community
Achievements		Russian	UK's national Russian newspaper
Nuacht24	Daily	Irish	For the Irish speaking community of Northern Ireland and Irish immigrants
Y Cymro	Weekly	Welsh	For the Welsh-speaking areas of Wales and Welsh immigrants
Toplum Postası		Turkish	Newspaper for the Turkish community in the UK
Garavi Gujarat	Weekly	Gujarati	Newspaper for the Gujarati community in the UK established in 1968

== Specialist newspapers ==
=== For specific ethnic groups ===
- Lanka Tribune – fortnightly newspaper for British Sri Lankans
- Nigerian Watch – fortnightly newspaper aimed at the Nigerian community in the UK
- The Irish World - weekly newspaper aimed at Britain's Irish Community
- The Irish Post - weekly newspaper aimed at Britain's Irish Community
- The Voice – weekly tabloid newspaper aimed at the British Afro-Caribbean community
- Eastern Eye – weekly newspaper for British Asians
- The South African – started as a London-based broadsheet newspaper aimed at providing news for South Africans living in London, now online.

=== For specific religions ===
- 5Pillars - Muslim news site
- The Baptist Times – Baptist/general Protestant newspaper
- The Catholic Herald – Catholic newspaper
- Christian Today – trans-denominational Christian newspaper
- Church of England Newspaper – weekly Anglican paper
- Church Times – weekly Anglican paper
- Hamazor – published by the London-based World Zoroastrian Organisation
- The Friend – weekly independent Quaker newsmagazine
- Jewish Chronicle – oldest continuously published Jewish newspaper in the world
- Jewish Telegraph – editions published for Manchester, Leeds, Liverpool and Scotland, Britain's only regional Jewish newspaper and has the longest serving editor of any newspaper in the country at its helm in Paul Harris.
- Jewish Tribune – Haredi Jewish; has section in Yiddish language
- Leeds Catholic Post – monthly Catholic paper for Leeds' Diocese
- Life and Work - monthly Church of Scotland magazine
- The Messenger – fortnightly Seventh-day Adventist news magazine
- The Muslim News – Islamic newspaper
- The Record - monthly Free Church of Scotland magazine
- The Tablet – Catholic newspaper
- The Universe – Catholic newspaper
- Several Muslim newspapers

=== Politics ===
- Fight Racism! Fight Imperialism! – bi-monthly newspaper of the Revolutionary Communist Group
- Black Flag – an anarchist publication
- Freedom – an anarchist publication.
- Irish Democrat – an Irish Republican weekly
- The New World – weekly pro-EU newspaper owned by Archant (formerly The New European)
- The News Line – daily newspaper of the Workers Revolutionary Party
- Scottish Socialist Voice – fortnightly newspaper of the Scottish Socialist Party
- The Socialist – weekly newspaper of the Socialist Party in England and Wales
- Socialist Worker – weekly newspaper from the Socialist Workers Party
- Solidarity – weekly newspaper of the Alliance for Workers' Liberty
- Weekly Worker – newspaper published by the Communist Party of Great Britain (Provisional Central Committee)

=== Sport ===
- The Cricket Paper – Friday paper summarising the week's cricketing news and action
- The Football Paper
- League Express – Monday paper covering all Rugby League news, results and fixtures
- The Non-League Paper – Sunday paper summarising the weekend's non-league football action and the week's non-league football news
- Racing +
- Racing Post – daily horse racing, greyhound racing and sports betting newspaper
- The Rugby Paper – Sunday paper summarising the weekend's rugby union action and the week's rugby union news
- The Sports Journal – Friday paper looking back at the weeks sporting news
- Wisden – weekly paper covering cricket news, articles, results and fixtures & other cricket related stories

=== Miscellaneous & special interests ===
- Black Country Bugle – weekly look at the history of the Black Country, published in newspaper format
- Bulletin – online only UK newspaper
- Classic Car Weekly – weekly newspaper for the classic car enthusiast
- The Day – online daily newspaper for schools
- The Economist – weekly news-focused magazine
- Estates Gazette – weekly newspaper aimed at property professionals
- Farmers Guardian – weekly newspaper aimed at the farming industry
- First News – weekly newspaper for children
- Hourglass – free monthly newspaper, published by Extinction Rebellion (XR)
- Lloyd's List – daily international maritime, shipping and transport newspaper
- London Gazette – official notices have to be published here; it is the oldest surviving English newspaper
- London Review of Books – fortnightly literary newspaper
- Mature Times – UK's only campaigning newspaper for the over-50s
- PennySaver – online only UK news on savings, penny saving advertisements
- PinkNews – UK-based online newspaper marketed to the lesbian, gay, bisexual and transgender (LGBT) community
- Private Eye – fortnightly satirical magazine
- The Stage – weekly newspaper covering entertainment issues, focused primarily on the theatre
- Times Educational Supplement – weekly newspaper for the teaching profession
- Times Higher Education – weekly newspaper for university / higher education profession
- Times Literary Supplement – weekly literary and cultural journal

== Restricted circulation newspapers ==
=== Corporate newspapers ===
- Ariel – BBC
- The Gazette – John Lewis Partnership

=== Prison newspapers ===
- Inside Time – a newspaper for prisoners and detainees.

=== Student newspapers ===
Student newspapers include:

==== National ====
- Student Times – free national student newspaper
- The Tab – national tabloid-style student news website

==== Regional ====
- Arts London News – University of the Arts London
- The Badger – University of Sussex
- The Beaver – London School of Economics
- The Boar – University of Warwick
- The Bournemouth Rock – Bournemouth University
- Brig – University of Stirling
- The Cambridge Student – University of Cambridge
- The Cheese Grater – University College London
- Cherwell – University of Oxford
- Concourse – Keele University
- Concrete – University of East Anglia
- The Courier – Newcastle University
- DGSChapter – Dartford Grammar School
- The Demon – De Montfort University
- The Edify – University of West London
- The Edge – University of Southampton
- Ely Ensign – Diocese of Ely
- Epigram – University of Bristol
- Exeposé – University of Exeter
- Felix – Imperial College London
- Forge Press (formerly Sheffield Steel Press) – University of Sheffield
- The Founder – Royal Holloway, University of London
- Gair Rhydd – Cardiff University
- The Galleon (formerly Pugwash News) – University of Portsmouth
- The Gaudie – University of Aberdeen
- Glasgow University Guardian – University of Glasgow
- The Gown - Queen's University Belfast
- The Gryphon (formerly Leeds Student) – University of Leeds
- Impact – University of Bath
- InQuire – University of Kent
- The Journal – University of Edinburgh, Heriot-Watt University, Edinburgh Napier University, Queen Margaret University and the Edinburgh College of Art
- The Knowledge – University of Plymouth
- The Leopard – Goldsmiths, University of London
- The Lion – Heythrop College, University of London
- Liverpool Student – University of Liverpool and Liverpool Hope University
- London Student – University of London
- The Magdalen – University of Dundee
- The Mancunion – University of Manchester (currently Britain's largest student newspaper)
- NewsPort – University of Wales, Newport
- Nouse – University of York
- Le Nurb – Brunel University
- OBScene – Oxford Brookes University
- The Oxford Student – University of Oxford
- The Oxford Blue - University of Oxford
- Palatinate – Durham University
- UCL Pi Media – University College London
- Platform (magazine) – Nottingham Trent University
- Pluto* – University of Central Lancashire
- Redbrick – University of Birmingham
- The Ripple – University of Leicester
- The River – Kingston University London
- ROAR – King's College London
- The Saint – University of St Andrews
- SCAN – Lancaster University
- Seren (English) and Y Ddraenen (Welsh) – University of Wales, Bangor
- The Smoke – University of Westminster
- Soton Tab – University of Southampton
- Source – Coventry University
- Space – University of Gloucestershire
- Spark* – University of Reading
- The Stag – University of Surrey
- Student – University of Edinburgh
- Unified – Canterbury Christ Church University
- The Universe – University of Hertfordshire
- Varsity – University of Cambridge
- The Voice – University of Worcester
- The Waterfront – University of Wales, Swansea
- Wessex Scene (formerly Wessex News) – University of Southampton
- The Wire – Bournemouth University
- York Vision – University of York

== Defunct newspapers ==
- 7 Days (1971–72) – weekly
- Accrington Observer and Times (1889–1999)
- Acton Gazette (1871–1988)
- Anti-Jacobin (1797–98) – weekly
- The Asian Leader
- Athletic News (1875–1931) – weekly
- Banbury Cake (–2017) – weekly paper merged with The Oxford Times
- Bell's Life In London and Sporting Chronicle (1822–1866), aka Bell's Life – weekly
- Bell's Weekly Messenger (1796–1896) – weekly
- Bedfordshire on Sunday (1977–2017)
- Black Dwarf (1817–1824)
- The Black Dwarf (1968–1972)
- Bournemouth Graphic (1902–1937)
- Brighton Herald (1806–1971) – weekly
- Brighton Voice (1973–1989)
- British Gazette (1926) – government newspaper published during the General Strike
- BusinessAM (2000–2002) – Daily Business and finance paper published by Bonnier Group
- The Children's Newspaper (1919–1965) – weekly
- Chiswick Times (est 1895)
- Coventry Observer(1808–1940) – weekly
- Coventry Standard
- Daily Chronicle (1872–1930) – daily
- Daily Courant (1702–1735) – daily
- Daily Dispatch (1900–1955; merged with News Chronicle) – daily
- Daily Herald (1912–1964; relaunched as The Sun) – daily
- Daily News (1846–1930) – daily
- Daily Post (1719–1771) – daily
- Daily Sketch (1909–1971) – daily
- Daily Worker (1924–1966) – daily
- Daltons Weekly (c.1860–2011)
- The Derby Mercury (1732–1933)
- Derby Trader (1966–2008) – weekly
- Desi Xpress – the UK's only national Asian entertainment weekly tabloid newspaper
- Dispatch (Birmingham)
- Doncaster Gazette (1786–1981) – weekly
- Eastern Counties' Times (1893–1935)
- Eastern Morning News (1864–1929)
- Edinburgh Courant (1705–1720)
- Empire News (1884–1960; merged with News of the World)
- Esher News & Mail (1936–2009; merged with Surrey Advertiser)
- English Churchman (1761–2023) – aimed at Protestants
- The European (1990–1999) – weekly
- Evening News (1881–1980, briefly revived 1987)
- The Examiner (1808–1886)
- Exchange Herald (1809–1826) – weekly
- Financial News (1884–1945)
- Forest Hill & Sydenham Examiner (1895–1933)
- The Freewoman (1911–1912)
- Gandalf's Garden (1968–1972)
- The Graphic (1869–1932) – weekly
- The Guardian and Public Ledger London newspaper (1832–1834)
- Halifax Evening Courier (1877–1965)
- Hampshire Telegraph (1799–1961)
- Holme Valley Express (-2007)
- The Huddersfield Chronicle and West Yorkshire Advertiser/Huddersfield Chronicle (1850-1916)
- The Independent (1986–2016; website continues)
- The Independent on Sunday (1990–2016) - weekly
- International Times (1966 – October 1973)
- Jackson's Oxford Journal/Oxford Journal Illustrated (1753–1911)
- The Kensington News and West London Times (1869–1972)
- Kent on Sunday (2002–2017)
- Labour Elector (1888–1894)
- The Lancaster Observer and Morecambe Chronicle (1860–1944)
- Leeds Mercury (1718–1939)
- Leeds Times (1833–1901) – weekly
- The Leigh Times (1984–2023)
- Liverpool Daily Post (1855–2013)
- Liverpool Mercury (1811–1904)
- The London Paper free evening London newspaper (2006–2009)
- Manchester Chronicle (1781–1842)
- Manchester Evening Chronicle (1897–1963; merged with Manchester Evening News)
- Manchester Gazette (1795–1828)
- Manchester Herald (1792–1793)
- Manchester Observer (1818–1821)
- Mark Lane Express (1832–1924)
- Medway News (1859–2011)
- Mercurius Aulicus (1643–1645)
- Morecambe Guardian (1922–1960)
- Morning Chronicle (1769–1862)
- Morning Post (1772–1937) – daily
- The Nation (1921–1931) – weekly
- The National Student (2002–2019)
- News Chronicle (1930–1960) – daily
- The New Daily (1960s) – daily
- The New Day (2016) – daily
- News of the World (1843–2011) – weekly
- News on Sunday (1987) – weekly
- Norfolk News (1845–1961)
- Northampton Herald & Post (1975–2016)
- Northern Star (1792–1797)
- The Northern Whig (1823–1963)
- The North Briton (1762–3, 1768–71)
- North West Enquirer (2006) – weekly
- Norwich Post (1721–) – first provincial paper
- Oxford Chronicle and Reading Gazette (1837–1929)
- Oxfordshire Guardian (2011–2018)
- Oxford Journal (1973–2014)
- Pall Mall Gazette (1865–1923)
- The Pink News (2006–2007)
- Pink Paper
- The Planet on Sunday (1996) – weekly (one edition published)
- Political Register (1802–1835)
- Poor Man's Guardian (1831–35) – edited by Henry Hetherington
- The Post (1988) – daily
- Preston Guardian (1844–1958) continued as Farmers Guardian
- Qanun (1890–1898) – Persian Language Monthly Newspaper
- Reading Evening Post
- The Reading Standard (1891–1963)
- Red Republican (1848–1850)
- Republican
- Reynolds' News (est. 1850; called the Sunday Citizen in its last five years of existence from 1962 to 1967)
- Saturday Review (1855–1938)
- SchNEWS (1994–2014) – weekly
- Sheffield and Rotherham Independent (1819-1938)
- Sheffield Register (1787–1794)
- Sheerness Guardian and East Kent Advertiser (1858–1939)
- Smethwick Telephone
- Shurey's Illustrated (1899–1903) – weekly
- Shurey's Pictorial Budget (1900–1900) - weekly
- Southwark and Bermondsey Recorder (1868–1933)
- Sporting Chronicle (1871–1983)
- Sporting Life (1859–1998)
- St James's Gazette (1880–1905)
- Staffordshire Mercury (1824–1848)
- Staffordshire Advertiser (1795–1955)
- Star
- "The Suffragette" (1912–1918) – weekly
- Sunday Correspondent (1989–1990) – weekly
- Sunday Dispatch (1928–1961) – weekly
- Sunday Graphic (1927–1960) – weekly
- Sunday Chronicle (1885–1955)
- Sunday Herald (1998–2018)
- Sunday Independent (South West England) (1808–2017) – Sundays
- Sussex Weekly Advertiser (1745–?)
- Thames Valley Times (est 1885)
- Time And Tide (1920–1970) – weekly, (1970–1979) – monthly
- Today (1986–1995) – daily
- Tunbridge Wells Advertiser (–1954)
- The Vote (1909–1933)
- Votes for Women (1907–1918)
- War Commentary
- Weekly Review
- Welsh Mirror
- Western Times (1827-1952)
- Westminster Gazette (1893–1928)
- Workers' Dreadnought (1914–1924)
- Yiddisher Telephone

== See also ==
- Mass media in the United Kingdom
- History of journalism in the United Kingdom
- Byline Times
- History of British newspapers
- Talking Newspaper Association of the United Kingdom
- List of newspapers in Australia
- List of magazines in Australia
- List of newspapers in Fiji
- List of magazines in Fiji
