= Yearsley (surname) =

Yearsley is a surname. Notable people with the surname include:

- Ann Yearsley (1753–1806), English poet and writer
- Ian Yearsley (born 1965), English historian of Essex and author
- James Yearsley (1805–1869), English aural surgeon and publisher
- Ralph Yearsley (1896–1928), British-born character actor

== See also ==
- Yearsley, a village in North Yorkshire, England
