= Sami Swoi =

Sami swoi may refer to:

- Sami swoi, a Polish film from 1967
- Sami Swoi, a Polish language magazine in the United Kingdom
- Sami Swoi, a Polish mobile brand
