= Tom Sandars =

British journalist (born 1976)

Thomas John Sandars (Born 7 February 1976) is a continuity announcer, newsreader and news presenter for BBC Radio 4.

== Education ==
From 1989 to 1994, Sandars was educated at The Oratory School, a Roman Catholic boarding independent school for boys in the village of Woodcote in Oxfordshire. He was active in Combined Cadet Force, in rowing and on stage. He was a joint founding editor of The Buzz school magazine and took A-levels in Art, Economics and English Literature.

He then went to the University of Reading, where he studied Typography and Graphic Communication. In 1995 he was the editor of the student union newspaper at Reading, The Spark.

== Career ==
He started at Radio Shropshire in 1998, moving to BBC Radio WM. He was a presenter on Midlands Today and was also their political reporter for The Midlands at Westminster. He then moved to Sky News.

Sandars was then a freelance newsreader for the BBC World Service. He has been a BBC Radio 4 continuity announcer since June 2017 and a BBC Radio 4 newsreader since May 2018. He was a newsreader and presenter for BBC Radio 5 Live for ten years from 2003. Between 2007 and 2017 he read news bulletins for BBC Radio 2 and for Radio 6 Music. Prior to 2017, he was also an arts correspondent; he can also be heard on Radio 4 political programmes.

On 9 April 2021, Sandars' voice was heard breaking into all BBC Radio programmes to announce the death of Prince Philip.
