= The Mill (newspaper) =

Local newspaper covering Greater Manchester, England

- Type: Daily newspaper
- Format: Online newspaper
- Founder: Joshi Herrmann
- Launched: June 2020
- Language: English
- City: Greater Manchester
- Country: England
- Sister newspapers: The Sheffield Tribune; The Liverpool Post; The Birmingham Dispatch; The Glasgow Bell; The Londoner
- Website: manchestermill.co.uk

The Mill, also known as The Manchester Mill, is an online newspaper covering Greater Manchester, England. Launched in June 2020, it publishes in-depth articles via email and the web for paying members alongside shorter versions for free subscribers. During its first year of operation, it gained more than 1,000 paying members and over 13,000 subscribers to its free mailing list.

The publication is primarily funded by subscription revenue, and, since October 2022, has been financially self-sustaining. It has also received a grant from its hosting platform, Substack—the only UK-based publication to receive funding from the programme—which enabled it to establish two sister publications in other northern England cities: The Tribune in Sheffield, and The Post in Liverpool.

On 14 December 2021, a 56-page print edition of The Mill was published, with 15,000 copies distributed in Manchester city centre. In August 2023, Mill Media secured £350,000 in seed investment from a group of prominent media figures, including Sir Mark Thompson, former Director‑General of the BBC and former president and CEO of The New York Times Company. The funding round was intended to support the organisation's expansion into additional UK cities.

Following the investment, The Mill announced plans to extend its model of long‑form local journalism beyond its existing titles in Manchester, Sheffield, and Liverpool. Coverage in Prolific North noted that the company was exploring launches in cities such as Leeds, Newcastle, Glasgow and Birmingham as part of its next phase of growth.

In 2024 a Glasgow title, The Bell, and a London edition, The Londoner, were launched. By 2025, reporting by the journalism institute Poynter described Mill Media as a growing local‑news network employing journalists in six cities, reflecting the wider expansion enabled by the 2023 funding round. By this time, the publisher had over 11,000 paying subscribers over all titles.

The company has repeatedly been threatened and sued for libel in what has been called Strategic Lawsuits Against Public Participation.

== See also ==
- List of newspapers in the United Kingdom
