= North Wales Weekly News =

Welsh newspaper

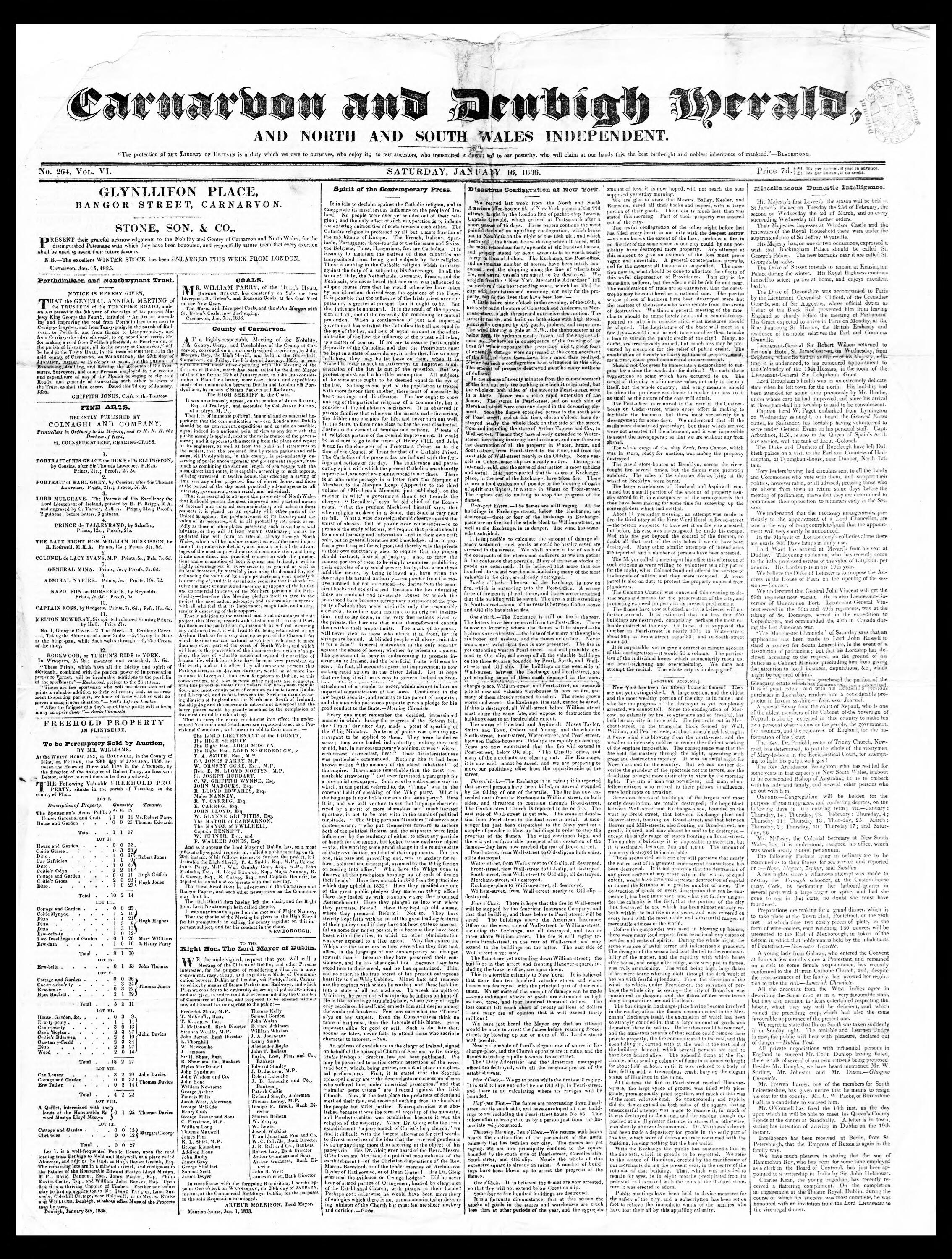
Carnarvon and Denbigh Herald; printed 16 January 1836; Number 254

The North Wales Weekly News is one of a group of newspapers published weekly in Llandudno.

== History ==
The newspaper was first published on 14 February 1889 by local printer Robert Evans Jones as the Weekly News and Visitors’ Chronicle for Colwyn Bay, Colwyn, Llandrillo, Conway, Deganway and Neighbourhood, a four-page broadsheet which cost 1d. Jones' brother William built a new printworks in 1900 on Conwy Quay, where the Weekly News continued to be published until May 1972 when it moved to new purpose-built premises in Llandudno Junction; shortly afterwards it abandoned hot metal typesetting in favour of computerised printing; later technological developments allowed copy to be transmitted to the printworks from branch offices elsewhere in North Wales. In 1988, the Jones family sold the newspaper to Trinity International plc, with Robert Evans Jones' great-nephew remaining chairman of the new board, and in 2014 the paper celebrated its 125th anniversary.

== Sister titles ==
Related titles cover most of coastal North Wales. Much of the material published is shared between a number of other titles but with the addition of some local material relevant to each specific title. Sister English language titles include:

- Abergele Visitor
- Bangor and Anglesey Mail
- Caernarfon Herald
- Denbighshire Visitor
- Flintshire Chronicle
- Holyhead and Anglesey Mail
- Rhyl Visitor
- Wrexham Chronicle

There is also one primarily Welsh language paper, Yr Herald.

The papers are owned and managed by Reach plc (formally Trinity Mirror), who also published the Liverpool Daily Post – a Welsh variant of the Daily Post – until that ceased publication in December 2013.
