= Wigan Post =

Daily tabloid newspaper for the Wigan region

- Front page from 4 January 2020
- Type: Local newspaper
- Format: Tabloid
- Owner: National World
- Publisher: Lancashire Publications Ltd
- Founded: 1950s
- Language: English
- Headquarters: Wigan Investment Centre, Waterside Drive, Wigan
- Circulation: 731 (as of 2023)
- ISSN: 2514-0922
- Website: wigantoday.net

The Wigan Post (formerly Wigan Evening Post and Chronicle and later just the Wigan Evening Post) is a weekly (changed from daily in August 2021) tabloid British regional newspaper for Wigan in Greater Manchester (formerly in the traditional county of Lancashire). It is owned by National World and published by Lancashire Publications, which has its offices in the town. The main area for the paper's distribution is around the Metropolitan Borough of Wigan. It is published on Fridays. It was founded in the 1950s as a subdivision of the Lancashire Evening Post. The website which the Wigan Post shares with its sister papers is Wigan Today. It also has an app for IOS and Android devices.

== Sister papers ==
=== Wigan Observer ===
The Wigan Observer is a weekly paid-for paper sold in the borough and is published each Tuesday. It was formed in 1853 as The Wigan Observer and District Advertiser and was family-run until 1966.

=== Freesheets ===
The Wigan Reporter was a freesheet weekly paper delivered in the Wigan area. It was founded in 1978. It ceased publication in February 2017 with many of its supplements being incorporated into the Post instead. It also had two other freesheets, St Helens Reporter and Leigh Reporter, which are published once per week.
