= Hull Daily Mail =

Newspaper for Kingston upon Hull, England

- Type: Daily newspaper
- Format: Tabloid
- Owner: Reach plc
- Editor-in-chief: Neil Hodgkinson
- Founded: 1885; 140 years ago
- Language: English
- City: Hull
- Country: England
- Circulation: 4,104 (as of 2024)
- ISSN: 1741-3419
- Website: hulldailymail.co.uk

The Hull Daily Mail is an English regional daily newspaper for Kingston upon Hull, in the East Riding of Yorkshire. The Hull Daily Mail has been circulated in various guises since 1885. A second edition, the East Riding Mail, covers East Yorkshire outside the city of Hull. The paper publishes everyday except Sunday.

The paper is published by Mail News & Media. Mail News & Media also publishes two free weekly newspapers, the Hull Advertiser and Beverley Advertiser, and a monthly magazine, The Journal. In 2012, Local World acquired owner Northcliffe Media from Daily Mail and General Trust. Trinity Mirror purchased Local World in 2015, and is now known as Reach plc.

== History ==
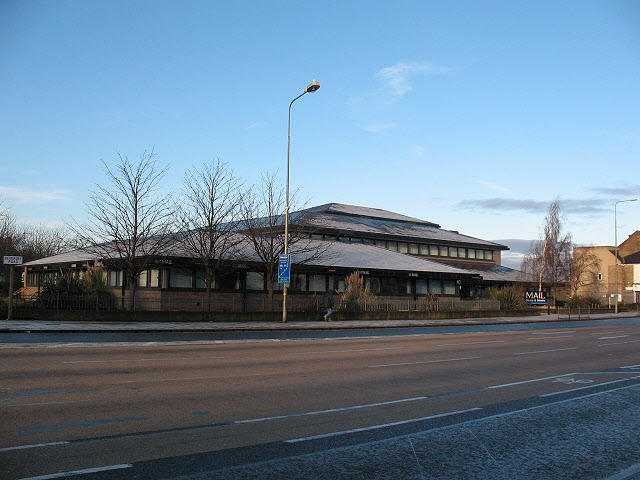
The offices of the Hull Daily Mail on Beverley Road in January 2011

The origins of the Hull Daily Mail can be traced back to the Hull Packet and Humber Gazette, a weekly newspaper established on 29 May 1787 that was printed on Scale Lane, a street in what is today part of Hull's Old Town. Its name was shortened to The Hull Packet in 1788. It was renamed The Hull Packet and Humber Mercury in 1827 before changing back to The Hull Packet in 1833. An issue of the Hull Packet consisted of four pages with eight columns of text on each page and cost 7d (£0.03) to purchase. In 1857, a Saturday edition named the Hull and North Lincolnshire Times was launched alongside the Packet.

In 1885, a consortium of Hull businessmen, including Frederick Brent Grotrian, the Conservative Member of Parliament for Kingston upon Hull East, purchased the Hull Packet, and on 29 September 1885, the first edition of the new Hull Daily Mail was published from a printing house on Whitefriargate. The Hull Packet continued to be published alongside the new newspaper until 26 February 1886, closing with issue number 5,288; from 8 March 1886, the Hull Daily Mail was published as The Hull Daily Mail And Hull Packet. In its early years, the Hull Daily Mail's editorial stance was declared as both defensive and aggressive conservatism, though with regard to local news and affairs, the newspaper's reporting was not influenced by national Conservative Party policy.

The Hull Daily Mail, then simply known as the Daily Mail, endured competition with other newspapers established on Whitefriargate in the 1910s, including the Eastern Morning News, Hull Evening News and the weekly Hull News all operating from an office on the north side of the street, while the Daily Mail and a number of its own weekly titles continued to publish in competition on the south side of the street. In 1926, the newspaper moved to a four-floor office on Jameson Street within the city centre named the 'Mail Buildings', which alongside additional office space, had more space for the newspaper's 24 Linotype machines and printing presses in the building's basement. Tabloid format was adopted in 1986, followed by a formal rebranding to the Hull Daily Mail, and the newspaper vacated the Jameson Street 'Mail Buildings' for a new complex on the junction of Spring Bank and Beverley Road, known as 'Blundell's Corner', in 1989.

In 1998, the Hull Daily Mail launched its website. In 2006, this website was used to launch the Hull Daily Mail's online video journalism service, the first such service to be launched for a local newspaper in the United Kingdom, and a sports news website named Sportshull was launched in 2007.

In 2015, the Hull Daily Mail received a new logo and general design to both the newspaper and website, replacing logos and styling that had been used since the mid-2000s, and introducing weekend supplements and a TV and entertainment guide named 'The View'.

As part of a Trinity Mirror restructure, Neil Hodgkinson, editor of the Hull Daily Mail, was promoted to editor-in-chief in February 2016 for Humber and Lincolnshire regions, overseeing the Grimsby Telegraph, Scunthorpe Telegraph and Lincolnshire Echo as well as the Mail. In March 2018 the Reach PLC titles for the North East, including the Chronicle, Journal and Teesside Gazette, were added to his portfolio of titles.

The Hull Daily Mail changed its banner head on its website to 'Hull Live' after the company was taken over by Trinity Mirror in 2017. Trinity Mirror was re-branded Reach plc in May 2018.

== Awards ==
The newspaper has won the award for Yorkshire Daily Newspaper of the Year five times, in 2003, 2004, 2006, 2007, and 2012.

== Supplements ==
- Monday – Extra Time (sport), The Match (Hull City A.F.C. reports)
- Tuesday – Femail
- Wednesday – The Business, HotShots (junior sport)
- Thursday – Property Guide
- Friday – Motor Mail
- Saturday – The Guide (entertainment magazine, includes TV listings)

For many years, a separate Sports Mail supplement was published Saturdays. Printed on distinctive green newsprint, it was available an hour after the end of the afternoon matches of the city's football and Rugby League teams, and newsagents would stay open specifically to sell and distribute it.
