= Lanka Tribune =

Lanka Tribune is a fortnightly free community newspaper published for Sri Lankans in the United Kingdom. The newspaper was launched in the UK in 2007 in compact size.

The newspaper is edited by Rasantha Cooray and published in Harrow, Middlesex. Lanka Tribune is registered as a newspaper in the UK and distributed in - London, Birmingham, Manchester, Leicester, Dublin, Glasgow, Colombo, Frankfurt, Paris and Rome.

The paper provides both community news for British Sri Lankans and news from the island of Sri Lanka.

- Source: Lanka Tribune Official Website

== See also ==
- Media in Sri Lanka
- List of newspapers in Sri Lanka
- List of newspapers in the United Kingdom
- Sri Lanka

== Current columnists and journalists ==
- Rasantha Cooray
- Andrew McLean
- Ivan Corea
- Sydney Reynolds
- Munza Mushtaq
- Keerthi Senanayake
- Suren Ladd
- Anand Vamadeva
- Risidra Mendis
- Sanjeevani Seneviratne
- Shyana Mushin
- Santhush Fernando
- Durga Ramachandran
- Amali De Alwis
- Sidanthi Siriwardena
- Anarkalee Robert
- Vickum Mahanama
