= The Echo (Essex) =

English daily newspaper serving South Essex

- Type: Daily newspaper
- Owner: USA Today Co.
- Publisher: Newsquest
- Editor: Chris Hatton
- News editor: Gary Pearson
- Language: English
- Headquarters: Howard Chase, Basildon, Essex, United Kingdom
- Country: United Kingdom
- Circulation: 6,885 (as of 2024)
- Website: echo-news.co.uk

The Echo is a daily newspaper serving South Essex, England. It used to be part of the Westminster Press owned by Pearson, and is now owned by Newsquest.

The paper was founded in September 1969 and is based in Basildon. Initially, it was known as the Evening Echo.

== See also ==
- History of British newspapers
