= Wakefield Express =

British city newspaper

- Type: Weekly newspaper
- Owner: National World
- Editor: Mark Bradley
- Founded: 1852
- Language: English
- Headquarters: Express House, Southgate, Wakefield, West Yorkshire WF1 1TE
- Circulation: 4,624 (as of 2022)
- Sister newspapers: Yorkshire Post Newspapers
- ISSN: 0961-2459
- Website: http://www.wakefieldexpress.co.uk

The Wakefield Express is the newspaper serving the City of Wakefield district in West Yorkshire, England. It was established in 1852 and was the subject of a centenary film directed by Lindsay Anderson in 1952. The newspaper is owned by National World and edited by Mark Bradley.

After 155 years of publication as a broadsheet, it changed to a tabloid format in March 2007.

The newspaper summarises content from other local newspapers such as the Pontefract & Castleford Express.

== Literacy campaign ==
The newspaper launched its "Read On" literacy campaign in 2006, prompted by statistics which showed that over 1,700 Wakefield adults cannot read. The campaign was backed by Tony Blair and Bridget Jones author Helen Fielding, and organised a Wakefield Book Day in March 2007 and provided reading material for primary school leavers worth £10,000. The campaign culminated at an event in Wakefield Cathedral.
