= Holme Valley Express =

The Holme Valley Express was an English local weekly newspaper covering Holmfirth and its surrounding area. It was first published as The Holmfirth Express.

The offices and presses for the paper were located in Holmfirth for many years. After the paper was purchased by the Huddersfield Daily Examiner printing was transferred to the Examiner's presses but the offices remained until 2002.

The paper ceased printing a weekly edition in 2007 and is now incorporated in the Saturday edition of the Huddersfield Examiner.

Much of the content of the Holme Valley Express was syndicated with its sister papers, the Colne Valley Chronicle and Huddersfield & District Chronicle.
