= The Hillingdon Herald =

British local newspaper

- Produced by Brunel University students for your community
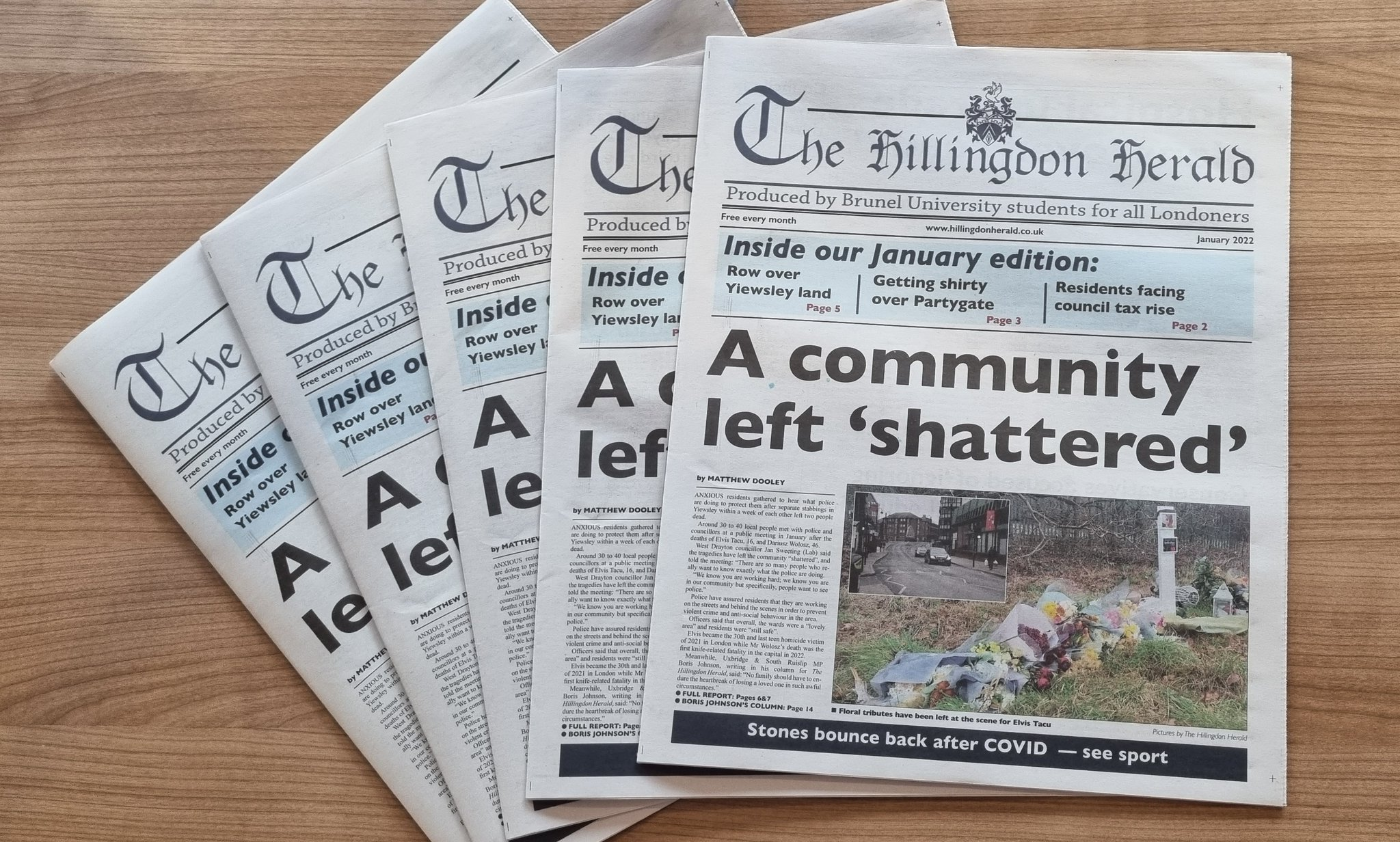
- Type: Monthly newspaper
- Format: Tabloid
- Owner: Brunel University of London
- Editor: Rachel Sharp
- Founded: October 2021; 5 years ago
- Political alignment: None
- Language: English
- Headquarters: Brunel University of London, Uxbridge, London
- City: Brereton, Staffordshire
- Country: United Kingdom
- Circulation: 10,000
- Website: www.hillingdonherald.co.uk

The Hillingdon Herald is a British local newspaper that covers the London Borough of Hillingdon. It was launched in October 2021 and has a distribution of 10,000 copies per issue.

Each issue, containing 24 pages, is published monthly. The paper is produced by students at Brunel University of London (20 to 25 of whom can be working on stories simultaneously) and is overseen by three lecturers of the university who previously worked as journalists. Brunel University of London currently funds The Hillingdon Herald.

== Writers ==
The paper is edited by Rachel Sharp, senior lecturer in journalism at Brunel University of London and former group editor of seven Newsquest London titles. Senior lecturer Steve Cohen is Head of News, and was formerly the editor of Newsquest's Bucks Free Press.

Former Prime Minister Boris Johnson was a columnist for the paper until he stepped down from the role of Prime Minister and MP for Uxbridge and South Ruislip. Columnists currently include MPs John McDonnell, David Simmonds, Danny Beales. Sections of the newspaper focus on different topics, with a page each dedicated to cooking, schools in the borough of Hillingdon, and music, among others.

The positions for editors of the paper such as news editor, features editor, and sports editor are held by current students. The individuals in this roles change when the students graduate.

== Availability ==
Copies are delivered to numerous pick–up points across Hillingdon, and are free. In October 2024, The Hillingdon Herald was shortlisted for the Times Higher Education (THE) Awards in the category of 'Outstanding Contribution to the Local Community'.
