= Southport Visiter =

Newspaper in Merseyside, England

- Type: Weekly newspaper
- Owner: Reach plc
- Founded: 1844
- Circulation: 912 (as of 2023)
- Website: southportvisiter.co.uk

The Southport Visiter is a weekly paid-for print newspaper covering Southport, Merseyside, England. It was founded in 1844 as a single sheet listing visitors to the seaside town. It is now owned by Reach Regionals, formerly Trinity Mirror, and in 2018 it was announced that its website would merge with that of the Liverpool Echo, with the distinct printed product continuing.

The paper was published from premises in Lord Street in Southport until 1889 when it moved to Tulketh Street. After printing ceased in Southport, the building was larger than needed, and for part of 2010 the ground floor was occupied by Southport Library. In 2014, it was announced that staff would move to a new "digital hub" on Lord Street, the street where the newspaper had begun. In July 2018, it was reported that the empty premises in Tulketh Street had been vandalised, and that staff were not working at the Lord Street premises but were based in Liverpool.

Former editors of the Southport Visiter included Alan Pinch and John Dempsey.

On April Fools' Day 2016, the paper published a hoax announcement that it would be changing the spelling of its name to Visitor, and a later retraction.

In 1996, the Press Complaints Commission rejected a case against the paper, brought by a man who believed it had published "intrusive amounts of detail regarding the conviction of a man for assaulting the complainant's sister-in-law".
