= Glossop Gazette =

Fortnightly newspaper

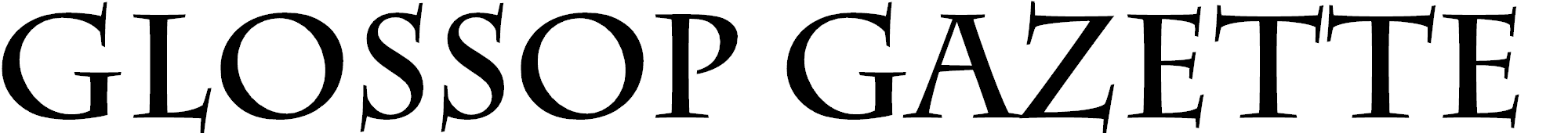
- Type: Fortnightly newspaper
- Format: Tabloid
- Editor: Daniel Bennett
- Founded: 18 October 2012
- Headquarters: Glossop, England
- Circulation: Unknown
- Price: 90p where sold, some free delivery.
- Website: glossopgazette.com

The Glossop Gazette is a fortnightly newspaper published by Viper Press in Glossop. The paper is specifically aimed at the local area, carrying no news from outside Glossop.
