= Goole Times =

Local newspaper for Goole, England

- Type: Weekly newspaper
- Format: Tabloid
- Owner: Chronicle Publications
- Publisher: Chronicle Publications
- Editor: Jane Rogers
- Deputy editor: Natalie Kershaw
- Founded: 1853
- Language: English
- Circulation: 6,287 (as of 2023)
- Website: gooletimes.info

The Goole Times is a weekly newspaper for the port town of Goole, in the East Riding of Yorkshire, England. It is the oldest and longest serving weekly newspaper in the county of Yorkshire.

== History ==
The Goole Times was established in 1853 and covers the town of Goole and surrounding villages. It is the longest standing newspaper in Yorkshire. The title is owned and published by Chronicle Publications, along with its sister paper the Selby Times.

The success of the Goole Times prompted Chronicle Publications to launch the Selby Post in November 1999. In August 2013 the company acquired the Selby Times newspaper title, which was then owned by Johnston Press. The two titles were merged under the title of the Selby Times.

== 19th century ==
The Goole Times was founded in 1853 as a monthly newspaper. By 1869 it had become a weekly paper and was called the Goole and Marshland Weekly Times. Ten years later, it was again renamed as The Goole Weekly Times.

== 20th century ==
In 1987 the paper amalgamated with the Goole and Howden Chronicle (founded in 1983), initially as the Goole Times and Chronicle and then later that year as the Times and Chronicle. It adopted its present title in 1997. For the latter half of the 20th century, the editor position was filled by Ernest Butler. Extracts and clippings of the Goole Times archive from 1915 to 1990 are held at the town's Waterways Museum.

== Present day ==
Editor Peter Butler was at the helm of the Goole Times from 2000 until 2010. Butler had secured a job at the paper when his father Ernest was the editor and was employed by the company for around four decades. He handed the reins to the paper's current editor Jane Rogers who became "not only the newspaper’s first woman editor in 157 years, but its youngest at the age of 31".

Butler's father Ernest Butler joined the editorial staff of the Goole Times as a reporter in 1928. Butler became managing editor and director of the paper in 1969 after returning from serving in Royal Corps of Signals during the Second World War.

In 2014, despite the shift to online news, The Goole Times was only three newspapers in the country to actually increase print sales. The Goole Times (incorporating the Selby Times) saw a rise of more than three quarters to 15,045 compared to the same period in 2013.

The paper was shortlisted for 'Best Weekly Newspaper' in the 2017 O2 Media Awards for Yorkshire and Humber. It was also finalists in the 'Team of the Year (print)' category at the awards in 2015. The team was made up of Daily Telegraph reporter Tom Kershaw who began his newspaper career at both of the titles in 2013.

Natalie Kershaw, the paper's deputy editor since 2018, received a nomination for 'Weekly News Reporter of the Year in September 2016 at the same annual O2 Media Awards ceremony.

The Goole Times and Selby Times received an unprecedented 1,000 toys for their annual Christmas toy appeal in December 2017.

The weekly paper ran a front-page story to help stop their town of Goole 'being cut in two' after their subway underneath Goole railway station floods in heavy rain. Brigg and Goole MP Andrew Percy later posted a copy of the paper to Network Rail asking for them to pledge work to fix the issue.

Reporter Ashley Pemberton, originally from Warrington, was the first reporter to have two different stories splash on both the Selby Times and Goole Times in the same week. He went on to dizzying heights in his journalism career, achieving a front page splash on the Daily Star on 11 December 2020 for a story on how the Prime Minister declared the World Pie Eating Championship would be cancelled.

In July 2019, The Goole Times owners Chronicle Publications decided to launch a third newspaper, The Epworth Times. This was following the closure of The Epworth Bells and Crowle Advertiser after 147 years by owners JPI Media.

Rogers described the new paper as "dedicated news pages to Epworth, Crowle, Haxey, Keadby, Belton and the surrounding areas" while expanding their current Crowle patch, which is covered in the Goole Times.

== Investigations ==
A covert investigation was launched by the Goole and Selby Times papers to snare paedophiles in the local area during summer 2016. The three month-long project was headed up by a team of reporters following a similar successful project undertaken by rival paper the Hull Daily Mail. Selby Times reporter James Morris posed as an underage girl and was immediately targeted by pervert, and ex-army officer, Paul Handley. Handley was snared in a sting by Morris, who created fake profiles and posed as an underage girl on an online chat room. He told Handley while posing as the girl he was 14-years-old. Handley arranged to meet the ‘girl’ after being tricked by Morris posing as a teenager on a social-networking site. Handley later received a suspended sentence almost a year after he attempted to meet Morris.

== Controversy ==
A complaint against the Goole Times had to be resolved in 2000 after the then Goole MP Ian Cawsey helped a constituent complain about the coverage of a young man's death. The then PCC Press Complaints Commission, which was later renamed the Independent Press Standards Organisation, deemed the paper's brief article about the death of Norman Woollass's son broke clause 5: Intrusion into grief and shock. The editor published an apology to the complainant.

In October 2013, the Goole Times published a picture of Sacha Baron Cohen while portraying the character Borat instead of the new Goole AFC owner Baron Bloom.
