= Selby Times =

UK local newspaper

- Type: Weekly newspaper
- Format: Tabloid
- Owner: Chronicle Publications Ltd
- Publisher: Chronicle Publications
- Editor: Jane Rogers
- Deputy editor: Natalie Kershaw
- Founded: 1860
- Language: English
- Circulation: 6,287 (as of 2023)
- Sister newspapers: Goole Times
- Website: selbytimes.info

The Selby Times is a local weekly newspaper covering Selby and the surrounding district in North Yorkshire, England. It is a paid-for title published weekly on Thursdays, and is the sister paper to the Goole Times, with which it shares content and staff.

== History ==
The Selby Times was first published in 1860 by Mr Bellerby, a printer and publisher. The paper was commended for its 150th anniversary by an Early Day Motion in the House of Commons in 2010.

=== Acquisition by Chronicle Publications ===
In July 2013 Johnston Press announced that they had reached agreement to sell the Selby Times and the Goole Courier, plus the associated websites, to Chronicle Publications Limited. Johnston Press had suffered from strikes in 2011 as a result of plans to reduce the number of job roles in its Yorkshire publications, and the Selby Times circulation figures released in February 2013 showed a reduction of 17.4% year on year to an average weekly figure of 5,765.

Following completion of the acquisition, Chronicle made a number of changes to the Selby Times. These included merging it with the Selby Post, which it had established previously, publishing under the name Selby Times & Post, and moving the publication day back to Wednesday after Johnston Press had amended it from Thursday in 2012.
