= Derby Trader =

Former British newspaper

The Derby Trader was the UK's first free newspaper, founded in 1966 by Lionel Pickering and Tony Mather, who became its first editor. It was originally part of Pickering's Trader Group, which was bought by Thomson in 1989. Ownership subsequently passed to Midland Independent Newspapers and then to Trinity Mirror, who announced the closure of the by then loss-making newspaper in 2008.
