= Stockport Express =

- Type: Weekly newspaper
- Format: Tabloid
- Owner: Reach plc
- Editor: Paul Harrison
- Staff writers: Alex Scapens, Matthew Davis, Katherine Vine, Todd Fitzgerald
- Headquarters: Manchester, England
- Circulation: 1,332 (as of 2023)
- Website: stockportexpress.co.uk

Stockport Express is the local newspaper of Stockport, Greater Manchester, England. It is published every Wednesday. The sister free paper the Stockport Times, published every Thursday and distributed to households in the Metropolitan Borough of Stockport, has a circulation of 83,709. The editor of both publications is Paul Harrison.

In 2009, along with all regional and local newspapers run by M.E.N media, the offices for the Stockport Express were relocated from Stockport, Greater Manchester to Manchester.

In 2010, the owners Guardian Media Group, sold the Stockport Express along with a number of other local newspaper titles to competitor Trinity Mirror plc, the deal included the Manchester Evening News.

The Stockport Express has won both local and national awards including 1999 Community Newspaper of the Year.
