= Grimsby Telegraph =

British regional newspaper

- Grimsby Telegraph cover on 26 June 2014
- Type: Daily newspaper
- Format: Tabloid
- Owner: Reach plc
- Editor-in-chief: Neil Hodgkinson
- Deputy editor: Jamie Macaskill
- Founded: 1897; 128 years ago
- Political alignment: Neutral, Populist
- Language: English
- Headquarters: Heritage House
- City: Grimsby
- Country: England
- Circulation: 2,758 (as of 2024)
- ISSN: 0961-7051
- OCLC number: 909904576
- Website: www.grimsbytelegraph.co.uk

The Grimsby Telegraph is a daily British regional newspaper for the town of Grimsby and the surrounding area that makes up North East Lincolnshire including the rural towns of Market Rasen and Louth. The main area for the paper's distribution is in or around Grimsby and Cleethorpes. It is published six days a week (daily except Sundays) with a free sister paper (Grimsby Target) being published once per week.

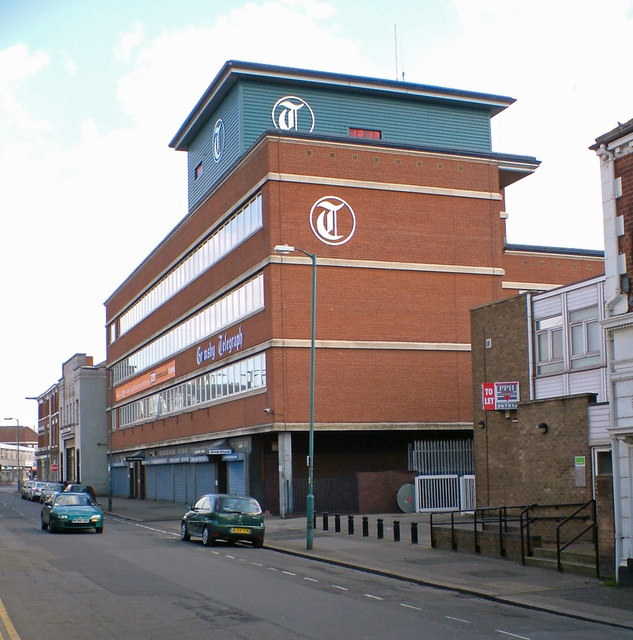
Headquarters in May 2007

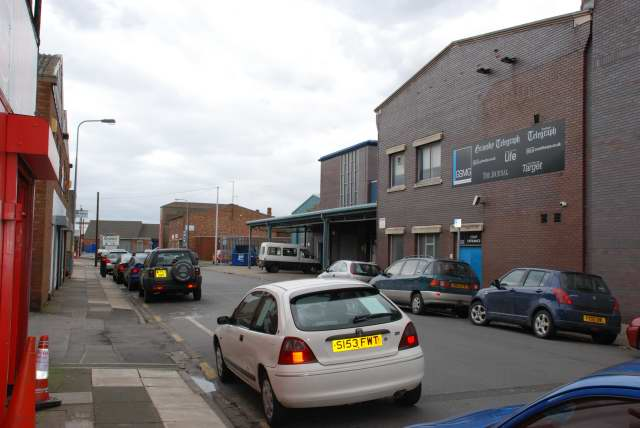
Rear of the offices in March 2008

== History ==
The paper was founded in 1897 as the Eastern Daily Telegraph. In 1899, it was renamed the Grimsby Daily Telegraph, while in 1932 it became the Grimsby Evening Telegraph. In 2002, it adopted its present name.

On 26 October 1976, after the newspaper offices had been knocked down and rebuilt, Anne, Princess Royal visited Grimsby and opened the new offices. The plaque unveiled by Princess Anne was repaired back to its original state and can now be viewed at John Barkers Solicitors, after the law firm acquired the property in 2018.

The newspaper began publication in "full-colour" print for the first time in 1995 for all editorial sections.

In March 1999, the newspaper launched its www.thisisgrimsby.co.uk website to break stories from the Grimsby Evening Telegraph as well as its sister weeklies, the Grimsby Target.

Due to economic downturn, restructuring and cost-cutting measures were put into place by the end of 2008, Daily Mail and General Trust closed their regional printing arm – Harmsworth printing plant, several Northcliffe newspapers were printed at the Cleethorpes Road site in Grimsby including the Hull Daily Mail.

After spending 118 years at offices located in Cleethorpe Road, Grimsby, Grimsby Telegraph moved to new offices in October 2015, on the first floor of Heritage House on Fisherman's Wharf – next to Grimsby Fishing Heritage Centre.

As part of a Trinity Mirror restructure, Neil Hodgkinson, editor of the Hull Daily Mail, was promoted to editor-in-chief in February 2016 for Humber and Lincolnshire regions, overseeing the Grimsby Telegraph, Scunthorpe Telegraph and Lincolnshire Echo as well as the Mail.

The weekly sister paper that is free, circulates under the name of Grimsby Post and Cleethorpes Post respectively.

Due to public demand, the Grimsby Target was relaunched in September 2015, it had originally closed back in March 2007.

== Editors ==
1897–1897: Philip Reid
1897–1904: Alfred Martin
1904–1914: Wilfred Vere Doughty BA, JP
1914–1932: Thomas William Symonds
1932–1933: Harold Wild
1933–1938: Hugh Paterson Haddow OBE, MC
1938–1946: John Taylor Brown MC
1946–1960: James H Giles
1960–1966: James Humble
1966–1973: Jack Whitfield
1973–1982: Frank Shelton
1982–2002: Peter Moore
2002–2017: Michelle Laylor
2017–: Jamie Macaskill

== Ownership and finances ==
In 2012, Local World acquired owner Northcliffe Media from Daily Mail and General Trust. In September 2015, Daily Mail and General Trust confirmed it had entered into talks to sell Local World to Trinity Mirror; the following month they reached an agreement with Local World's other shareholders to buy the company.

Following the acquisition of the UK publishing assets of Northern & Shell, including the Daily Express, Sunday Express, Daily Star and OK!; Trinity Mirror announced a plan to rebrand as Reach plc, subject to investor approval at a meeting scheduled for May 2018.

Print sales fell to 19,824, a drop of 5.1 per cent year on year in the second half of 2014. Circulation in the second half of 2016 was down 9.4 per cent year on year to an average of 16,406 copies per night, offset mainly due to website growth.

== Awards ==
The Grimsby Telegraph won "Scoop of the Year" in 1994 at the British Press Awards. Junior reporter Clare Henderson for the newspaper discovered hours before the official announcement that Norman Lamont was resigning as Chancellor of the Exchequer after his mother, who lived in Grimsby had been told by her son he was quitting, beating the country's top political journalists and Fleet Street's finest.

In 2001, Grimsby Telegraph won the pan-European award for customer care and service.

The Grimsby Telegraph was named regional best "Front page" of the year for 2007 at the Press Gazette awards.

== Supplements ==
- Monday – 12-page bygones section
- Tuesday – Young Stars youth sports section
- Wednesday – Midweek Guide, what's-on section
- Thursday – Motor Mail
- Friday – Property Guide
- Saturday – Weekend Guide, including TV listings, cinema information and local shows and gigs
