= Pontefract & Castleford Express =

Local British newspaper

- Type: Weekly newspaper
- Owner: National World
- Language: English
- Headquarters: 1 Front Street, Pontefract, West Yorkshire WF8 1BL
- Circulation: 2,913 (as of 2022)
- Sister newspapers: Wakefield Express
- Website: www.pontefractandcastlefordexpress.co.uk

The Pontefract & Castleford Express is a local newspaper covering the towns of Pontefract and Castleford in Wakefield District, West Yorkshire, northern England.

The newspaper is owned by National World. It is based in Front Street, Pontefract. The newspaper has a social media presence. The newspaper's content is summarised in the Wakefield Express.
