= Armagh Observer =

Northern Irish newspaper

- Type: Regional newspaper
- Owner(s): Observer Newspapers (N.I.) Ltd
- Founded: 1930
- Ceased publication: April 2017

The Armagh Observer was a regional newspaper covering the County Armagh area of Northern Ireland. It was owned by Observer Newspapers (N.I.) Ltd.

== History ==
The Armagh Observer was first published in 1930. It ceased publication in April 2017.
