= Nuacht24 =

Northern Irish newspaper

- Type: Weekly online newspaper
- Editor: Eoghan Ó Néill
- Founded: January 2009
- Language: Irish
- Website: http://www.nuacht24.com (defunct)

Nuacht24 (Irish pronunciation: [ˈn̪ˠuəxt̪ˠ ˌfʲɪçə ˈcahəɾʲ]; meaning "Twenty-four hour News") was an Irish language news website and weekly online newspaper with a weekly printed edition based in Belfast, Northern Ireland. It has been favourably received by Irish media as an independent, comprehensive, up-to-date news service. Nuacht24 launched a comprehensive video based service at www.nuacht24.com. It was founded by well-known journalist Eoghan Ó Néill.

== See also ==
- List of Irish-language media
