= Student Times (UK paper) =

British student newspaper

Student Times is a free English national student newspaper, launched in October 2004. Studenttimes.org was launched in March 2005.

The newspaper is distributed to universities and colleges within the United Kingdom, and the publication contains a mixture of national and international student news alongside graduate courses, graduate jobs and careers advice, features, entertainment articles and interviews from external sources.

Most articles, photographs and illustrations are written and produced by students.

Interviews so far have included Tracey Emin, Don McCullin, Goldie Lookin' Chain and Zero 7. In the run up to the 2015 General Election, Politics Editor Bridie Pearson-Jones interviewed both Nick Clegg, leader of the Liberal Democrats and Natalie Bennett, leader of the Green Party.

The paper carries frequent reports from the National Union of Students of the United Kingdom, the British Universities Sports Association and the Student Radio Association.
