= The Visitor (newspaper) =

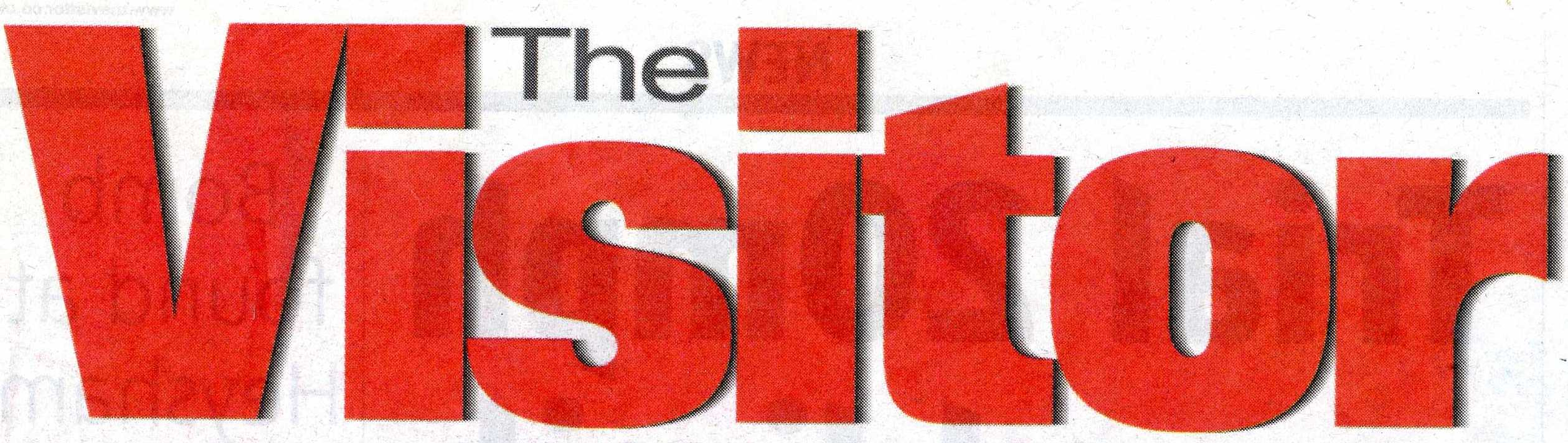
- Type: Weekly newspaper
- Format: Tabloid
- Owner(s): National World
- Publisher: Lancaster & Morecambe Newspapers Ltd
- Editor: Nicola Adam
- Founded: 1874
- Political alignment: Independent
- Language: English
- Headquarters: Morecambe, Lancashire
- Circulation: 583 (as of 2023)
- Sister newspapers: Lancaster Guardian
- Website: thevisitor.co.uk

The Visitor is a weekly paid-for newspaper published in Morecambe, Lancashire, England. It covers Morecambe and the surrounding district including Overton, Middleton, Heysham, Slyne, Hest Bank, Bolton-le-Sands and Carnforth.

Until 2014 the paper was published from offices in Victoria Street, Morecambe by Lancaster & Morecambe Newspapers Limited, a wholly owned subsidiary of Johnston Press plc. From February 2014 the editorial base for the paper, along with sister newspaper Lancaster Guardian, was moved to new offices on the White Lund Industrial Estate, Morecambe. Printing of the paper is contracted elsewhere.

As from 21 September 2011 the dateline for The Visitor changed from Wednesday to Tuesday. This reflected the fact that the newspaper was on sale in the shops from the Tuesday afternoon. It is sold around the Morecambe Bay area from Grange-over-Sands and Kendal in the north to Galgate in the south.

== History ==
The newspaper was founded in 1874, the first issue being on Thursday 4 June 1874 at a cover price of 1d. It then had the fuller title, The Morecambe Visitor and General Advertiser, and consisted of four pages, 18 inches x 12 inches. The founding proprietor, George Bingham, had started the paper more as a service to the visiting holiday makers than the resident population, hence the origin of its name. Initially it was issued in the summer months only but after good sales George decided to publish it weekly throughout the year. A new office was opened in Victoria Street, Morecambe, which became the centre for both editorial and printing for many years.

In 1898, Arthur Caunt joined the newspaper as a reporter and this started the long involvement of the Caunt family with the paper which lasted until 1986. Arthur took over as editor and proprietor in 1906 and formed the family company, The Morecambe Press Ltd. He remained in that role until he died in 1938. His son, James Caunt, then took over until he died in January 1959. Responsibilities then passed to James's son, Arthur. However, Arthur died 12 months later in a car accident, and his sister, Muriel Bates, found herself having to take the helm. After two years, Muriel passed the editorial role to an ‘outsider’, Derek Mosey, but remained as proprietor. The family finally sold the business in 1986 to United Provincial Newspapers, who then merged the paper with the Lancaster Guardian to be run jointly under the new subsidiary company, Lancaster & Morecambe Newspapers Ltd. The company has subsequently been taken into the Johnston Press group.

Perhaps the most sensational episode in the paper's history occurred with the edition of 6 August 1947. James Caunt, the editor, and not afraid to speak his mind in the Mustard and Cress editorial piece, penned a diatribe against British Jews for not doing more to prevent Zionist killing of British troops in Palestine, describing Jews as 'a plague on Britain' and encouraging violence against them. This brought a wave of condemnation, eventually resulting in the judiciary summoning Caunt for seditious libel. Widespread press coverage was given, even a report in the Sydney Morning Herald paper. In a high-profile trial at Liverpool Assizes, with Caunt being defended by the nation's leading advocate, he was found not guilty. The Visitor reported the acquittal on the front page, normally reserved for advertisements only. Soon afterwards, this led the paper to decide to permanently have news on the front page and to move advertisements to the inside pages, becoming the first local newspaper to do so.

For many years after the Second World War, the paper had the strap line "founded in 1874 when income tax was 1d in the £". This was originally a sideswipe by James Caunt at the high-taxing post-war Labour government, but became a long-running hall mark of the paper.

In 2005 the paper received a special RNLI award for its support and coverage of the lifeboats during the cockle picking tragedy in Morecambe Bay in February 2004.

On 14 December 2021 the visitor website was shut down, visitors thereafter being redirected to the Lancaster Guardian website.

== Editors ==
Term	Editor
1874 – 1906	George Bingham
1906 – 1938	Arthur Caunt
1938 – 1959	James Caunt
1959 – 1960	Arthur Caunt (Jnr.)
1960 – 1962	Muriel Bates
1962 – 1992	Derek Mosey
1992 – 1998	Mike Whalley
1998 – 2009	Glen Cooper
2009 – 2010	Ingrid Kent (acting editor)
2010 – 2012	Steve Brauner
2012 – present	Nicola Adam
