= Congleton Chronicle =

Newspaper published in Cheshire, England

- Type: Weekly newspaper
- Owner: Condliffe family
- Founder: Robert Head
- Founded: 1893
- City: Congleton, Cheshire
- Website: chronicleseries.com

The Congleton Chronicle is a weekly newspaper published every Thursday in Congleton, Cheshire, England. Founded in 1893 by Robert Head at 11 High Street, Congleton, the newspaper remains at that address, and is the only independently owned, paid-for newspaper in Cheshire.

The paper is owned by the Condliffe family, following a management buyout led by former editor John Condliffe in 1988. His son Jeremy is the current editor – only the fourth since the paper was founded – who created the second father to son succession (after Robert Head to his son Lionel).

In addition to the Congleton Chronicle, the company also publishes the Sandbach Chronicle, the Biddulph Chronicle and, launched in January 2012, the Alsager Chronicle. The newspapers have a combined circulation of 15,842, and are read by approximately 42,000 people.
