= The Leigh Times Series =

British newspaper group

The Leigh Times Series was a group of local English newspapers based in Essex owned and run by the Tindle Newspaper Group since 2008. It closed in 2023.

== History ==
The Leigh Times was started in 1983 in Leigh-On-Sea by Michael and Shirley Guy. The group went on to launch various local titles including Rayleigh Times, The Canvey and Benfleet Times and The Southend Times (ceased 2009). The group was purchased by Tindle Newspaper Group in 2008 after Michael and Shirley Guy decided to retire.

Southend historian and author Ian Yearsley began his career with the Leigh Times.
