= Salford Advertiser =

British newspaper founded 1982 (1868 roots)

- Type: Weekly newspaper
- Format: Tabloid
- Owner(s): Reach plc
- Website: www.salfordadvertiser.co.uk

The Salford Advertiser was a weekly newspaper serving the towns, villages and districts in the City of Salford in Greater Manchester, England. It closed in 2015.

== History ==
Founded in 1982 as The Advertiser, the newspaper merged with the Salford City Reporter in 1997, a newspaper that traces its roots back to The Salford Chronicle, founded in 1868. The 1997 merger went through various names, including the first use of The Salford Advertiser in 1999, returning to that name for good in 2010.

For calendar year 2014, The Salford Advertiser had an average weekly circulation of 67,428. It is published on Thursdays. It was published by Manchester Evening News Media Ltd. (MEN Media Ltd.), until MEN Media was purchased by the Trinity Mirror group in 2010.

The newspaper was closed in 2015 and incorporated into the Manchester Weekly News, which closed in 2022.

== Circulation ==
The paper served Barton upon Irwell, Boothstown, Broughton, Broughton Park, Cadishead, Charlestown, Clifton, Eccles, Ellenbrook, Ellesmere Park, Hazelhurst, Higher Broughton, High Town, Irlam, Irlams o' th' Height, Langworthy, Little Hulton, Lower Broughton, Lower Kersal, Monton, Ordsall, Patricroft, Peel Green, Pendlebury, Pendleton, Salford, Salford Quays, Seedley, Swinton, Walkden, Weaste, Winton and Worsley.

== Editors ==
It was edited by Simon Keegan, with assistant editor Tony Howard. Its reporters were Kathryn Ryan, Ailsa Cranna, Kate Watkins and Pamela Welsh.
