= Star Courier =

Newspaper in Kewanee, Illinois

- Type: Daily newspaper
- Format: Broadsheet
- Owner: USA Today Co.
- Publisher: David Adams
- Editor: Mike Helenthal
- Founded: May 2, 1898, as Kewanee Daily Star-Courier
- Headquarters: 105 East Central Boulevard, Kewanee, Illinois 61443, United States
- OCLC number: 27314941
- Website: starcourier.com

The Star Courier is an American daily newspaper published in Kewanee, Illinois. It is owned by USA Today Co.

The daily newspaper is the largest of company's holdings in Henry County, Illinois, which also include the shopper publication Henry County Advertizer and four weekly newspapers in outlying towns: the Cambridge Chronicle of Cambridge, Galva News of Galva, Geneseo Republic of Geneseo and Orion Gazette of Orion.

The Star Courier was founded in 1898 through the merger of the Kewanee Evening Star and Kewanee Daily Courier, both of which had been founded in the 1890s. Lee Enterprises owned the paper from 1926 to 1999, when it was traded to GateHouse Media.
