= Ian Yearsley =

English historian

Ian Yearsley is a local historian and author of books on the history of Essex.

== History ==
Ian Yearsley was born in Ingatestone, Essex in 1965, moving to Southend-on-Sea, Essex in 1972. He started out as a journalist with the Leigh Times in 1988 before producing historical books on Essex, as well as poetry and fiction titles based on the county's history.

His first book, "Islands of Essex" (ISBN 9780860255086), was published in 1994. He has since written numerous books on the history of Essex, four works of fiction, three poetry books and the introductions to four historic maps, all based on Essex, as well as a book on language. His maps were published by Alan Godfrey in 2019.

In the 1990s Yearsley wrote for various magazines, including Essex Countryside and This Month in Essex, and he has been a regular commentator for local newspapers.

Yearsley was involved in the 1,000th anniversary commemorations of the Battle of Assandun at Ashingdon in Essex, following the publication of various editions of an epic poem he wrote about it between 2006 and 2016.

In 2011 he achieved an MA in history from the University of Essex, where he won an award for his dissertation on population migration in the Rochford Hundred in the late 19th century.

Yearsley has created historic tours of Essex and Suffolk for iPhone and has worked on a project to uncover the history of a lost Jacobean manor at Marks Hall near Coggeshall. He has also worked at Tilbury Fort for English Heritage.

He has associations with the Hadleigh & Thundersley Community Archive and has attended their events. He also recorded the demolition of St Erkenwald's Church in Southend-on-Sea in 1995.

== Bibliography ==
- 1994 - Islands of Essex ISBN 9780860255086 Publisher: Ian Henry Publications
- 1996 - Dedham, Flatford & East Bergholt: A Pictorial History ISBN 9781860770104 Publisher: Phillimore & Co. Ltd.
- 1997 - Ingatestone & Fryerning: A History ISBN 9780860254812 Publisher: Ian Henry Publications
- 1998 - Hadleigh Past ISBN 9781860770784 Publisher: Phillimore & Co. Ltd
- 1999 - Essex Events ISBN 9781860771019 Publisher: Phillimore & Co. Ltd
- 2000 - Islands of Essex (2nd Edition) ISBN 9780860255093 Publisher Ian Henry Publications
- 2001 - A History of Southend ISBN 9781860771880 Publisher: Phillimore & Co. Ltd
- 2005 - Rayleigh A History ISBN 9781860773556 Publisher: Phillimore & Co. Ltd
- 2006 - Tears of Poignancy ISBN 9781899820221 Publisher: Paragon Publishing
- 2006 - The Battle of Ashingdon (1016) [ISBN unspecified] Publisher: Ian Yearsley
- 2009 - Unspoken Understanding (a collection of thirty poems about love, life and Essex) ISBN 9781899820627 Publisher: Paragon Publishing
- 2012 - The Curse of Cannow's End ISBN 9781908645104 Publisher: Melrose Books
- 2014 - The Blackwater Saga: A Victorian Riverside Romance ISBN 9781782222941 Publisher: Paragon Publishing
- 2014 - Looking for a Lost Leigh Love ISBN 9781782223139 Publisher: Paragon Publishing
- 2016 - Southend in 50 Buildings ISBN 9781445651880 Publisher: Amberley Publishing
- 2016 - The Battle of "Assandun" (1016) Publisher: Ashingdon Parish Council
- 2017 - Return to Cannow's End ISBN 9781782225348 Publisher: Paragon Publishing
- 2018 - Dracula – The Essex Connection ISBN 9781782225782 Publisher: Paragon Publishing
- 2019 - Old Ordnance Survey Maps - Southend Seafront 1921 ISBN 9781787212268 Publisher: Alan Godfrey Maps
- 2019 - Old Ordnance Survey Maps - Southend (Town Centre) 1921 ISBN 9781787212251 Publisher: Alan Godfrey Maps
- 2019 - Old Ordnance Survey Maps - Leigh-on-Sea 1921 ISBN 9781787212435 Publisher: Alan Godfrey Maps
- 2019 - Old Ordnance Survey Maps - Westcliff-on-Sea 1921 ISBN 9781787212442 Publisher: Alan Godfrey Maps
- 2020 - Single-Context Words: A Study of a Quirk of the English Language ISBN 9781782227786 Publisher: Paragon Publishing
- 2021 - An Essex Quizbook ISBN 9781782228547 Publisher: Paragon Publishing
- 2022 - Secret City of Southend ISBN 9781398111547 Publisher: Amberley Publishing
- 2023 - Ashingdon & South Fambridge: A History ISBN 9781782229773 Publisher: Paragon Publishing
- 2025 - City of Southend: A Potted History ISBN 9781398120006 Publisher: Amberley Publishing
- 2026 - Windmills of Essex ISBN 978-1-3981-2577-3 Publisher: Amberley Publishing
