= East Kent Mercury and Dover Mercury =

Weekly newspapers serving the district of Dover in Kent

East Kent Mercury

- Type: Weekly newspaper
- Format: Tabloid
- Owner: KM Group
- Publisher: KM Group
- Editor: Beth Robson
- Founded: 1865 (East Kent Mercury); 1998 (Dover Mercury)
- Language: English
- Headquarters: Deal, Kent
- Circulation: 4,798 (as of March 2019)
- Price: 70p
- Website: www.kentonline.co.uk/east_kent_mercury/news.aspx

The East Kent Mercury and Dover Mercury are weekly newspapers serving the district of Dover in Kent. The Dover Mercury covers the town of Dover, and the East Kent Mercury the towns of Deal and Sandwich. They are owned by the KM Group and are published on Thursdays.

== History ==
The East Kent Mercury was founded in 1865.

The KM Group bought the Mercury in 1980 from Kent County Newspapers.

The East Kent Mercury was originally designed to serve the entire district of Dover, however in 1998 the Dover Mercury broke away from the East Kent Mercury as a paper in its own right. Both papers still feature the same editor, reporters and some of the same articles.

Along with the rest of the KM-owned papers, the Mercury series was given a design overhaul in May 2005.

In February 2009 the Mercury had to change its front page about a murder trial at the last moment following a court order. The KM Group was successful in overturning the court order and the story was allowed to be published on the Mercury website.

== Offices ==
Both versions of the Mercury are based at the KM Group's Deal office. Previously the Dover Mercury was based at the Dover office before this was closed by the Group.

== Circulation ==
The combined circulation of the Mercury series (East Kent and Dover) as of the first half of 2009 is 11,900. This represented a drop of 9.8% against the same time the previous year.
