= Leeds Catholic Post =

The Leeds Catholic Post is a newspaper serving the Catholic communities of Leeds, Huddersfield, Bradford, Halifax, Harrogate, Wakefield and the surrounding towns and villages. It was first published in 1989. The paper is edited by the Diocese of Leeds. The paper has been published every month for the past 20 years and has covered some of the major Catholic events to take place in the Leeds area during this time.
