= BG BEN Newspaper =

Bulgarian newspaper in the United Kingdom

BG BEN Newspaper (Bulgarian: Вестник БГ БЕН) is the most widely circulated Bulgarian newspaper in the United Kingdom. It is printed every two weeks (26 issues yearly), each containing 48 pages and 6,000 copies in print.

== Purposes ==
The newspaper aims to unite the Bulgarian community while providing expert advice and news coverage.

== History ==
BG BEN Newspaper was initially launched in London on March 30, 2004, featuring an A4 format with eight weekly pages. An additional eight-page insertion in English, titled 'Bulgaria', showcased the country's potential as a tourism, business, and real estate hub.

In June 2005, the newspaper underwent changes to become a standard tabloid format, shifted to a bi-weekly printing schedule, and increased its page count to 32 pages.

In November 2007, the newspaper's English section was transformed into Bulgarian language pages, leading to a boost in printed copies and expansion of the distribution network. This ultimately propelled the newspaper to become the largest Bulgarian printed media in Great Britain.

== BG BEN Newspaper Today ==
Roughly 90% of its distribution goes to the Bulgarian community in London, with copies being delivered to over 100 locations in London as well as other cities such as Manchester, Birmingham, Bristol, Kent, Watford, Southampton and Stockport.

The newspaper contains news and events for the Bulgarians in the UK, advice on life and work in the UK and services available to the community, pages dedicated to rock music and rock events, facts and news about Bulgaria, as well as adverts and leisure time pages.

== Sources ==
- https://btvnovinite.bg/40169-Britanski_eksperti_shte_izvarshat_proverka_u_nas__po_skandala_s_vizite.html
- https://www.bta.bg/bg/bg-world/648201-izleze-yubileen-broy-na-vestnik-bg-ben-vav-velikobritaniya
- https://bnr.bg/radiobulgaria/post/102131639/izleze-broi-3-za-2025-g-na-balgarskia-vestnik-vav-velikobritania-bg-ben
- https://www.bta.bg/bg/news/543564-noviyat-broy-na-vestnik-bg-ben-koyto-izliza-vav-velikobritaniya-e-posveten-na-
- https://hristianstvo.bg/%D0%B4%D0%BE%D1%86-%D0%BC%D0%B0%D1%80%D0%B8%D1%8F%D0%BD-%D1%81%D1%82%D0%BE%D1%8F%D0%B4%D0%B8%D0%BD%D0%BE%D0%B2-%D0%B2%D1%8A%D0%B7%D0%BA%D1%80%D0%B5%D1%81%D0%B5%D0%BD%D0%B8%D0%B5%D1%82%D0%BE-%D0%B5/
