= OneMK =

Former newspaper in United Kingdom

- Type: Weekly freesheet
- Format: Tabloid
- Owner: Local World
- Publisher: Sharon Hobday
- Editor-in-chief: Cally Jenkins
- Founded: August 2002
- Ceased publication: October 2016
- Language: English
- Website: onemk.co.uk

OneMK (formerly MK News) was a local weekly free newspaper and online news service, based in Milton Keynes.

MK News launched in August 2002 and was delivered to homes across the Milton Keynes urban area and to commuters at Milton Keynes Central railway station.

It re-branded itself to OneMK in early 2016 before its owners, Trinity Mirror, closed the publication in October 2016.

The paper was delivered on Wednesdays (competing with the Milton Keynes Citizen, which is distributed free on Thursdays). The newspaper claimed an audited adult readership of 130,000.

== OneMK online ==
The offices of MKWeb

OneMK.co.uk (formerly MKWeb) was the website counterpart to OneMK, the newspaper. Articles that appeared in the paper also appeared online at onemk.co.uk, along with extra daily news reports that may not have featured in the weekly newspapers.

MKWeb was the portal operated by Iliffe News and Media partially on behalf of Milton Keynes Council and accordingly described itself as the official website for Milton Keynes and North Bucks. The site was run under varying management from 2002. In June 2006, MKWeb was awarded the contract to deliver MK Council's web services for the following 5 years with an option for the council to extend this for a further 3 years. The agreement was that MKWeb would develop and support two websites, www.milton-keynes.gov.uk and www.mkweb.co.uk, and present them as a single city portal. In 2007, MKWeb's parent company, Apollo Digital Developments Ltd, was bought by the Iliffe News and Media group.

== Ownership ==
OneMK was 'published and originated by a division of Local World.

In 2012, Local World acquired MK News owner Iliffe News and Media from Yattendon Group.

In November 2016, Local World became part of Trinity Mirror.
