= Sussex Weekly Advertiser =

- Type: Weekly newspaper
- Founder: William Lee
- Founded: 1745
- Ceased publication: 1910

The Sussex Weekly Advertiser, also known as the Lewes and Brighthelmstone Journal, was an early newspaper published weekly in Lewes, Sussex, England. Founded in 1745 by William Lee (1713–1786), a native of Chichester, it is considered to be the first-ever newspaper in the county of Sussex. The newspaper was known as a republican paper and was against aristocratic privilege.

Lee's sons William Lee (1747–1830) and Arthur Lee (1759–1824) succeeded him as joint editors. William Lee (1747–1830) was a member of the Lewes debating society, the Headstrong Club and a friend of Thomas Paine, who was a resident of Lewes between 1768 and 1774.

Historians credit Paine with authoring a satire that appeared in the Sussex Weekly Advertiser called 'The Trial of Farmer Short's Dog Porter'. Three local judges did not like the way a farmer named Short had voted in a recent parliamentary election, so they tried his dog, named Porter, after it inadvertently killed a hare, ordering it to be hanged. Paine denied writing that he ever published anything before leaving for the United States, but it is thought that the evidence that he did is too compelling. There are several plausible reasons for his denials, including the likelihood that he wanted to protect family and friends from reprisals for his incendiary political writings.

In 1910, Sussex Weekly Advertiser ceased publication.
