= Rugby Observer =

English newspaper

- Type: Weekly newspaper
- Format: Tabloid
- Owner(s): Bullivant Media
- Founded: 1991
- Political alignment: Non-partisan
- Language: English
- Headquarters: Redditch; Worcestershire; England
- Circulation: 2,184 (as of 2023)
- Website: rugbyobserver.co.uk

The Rugby Observer is a free weekly newspaper covering Rugby town in Warwickshire, England, and its surrounding villages. It first published in 1991.

The Rugby Observer is part of Observer Standard Newspapers which was set up in 1989 by current owners Chris and Pat Bullivant. The company is now called Bullivant Media LTD.

The current editorial team at the Rugby Observer and its sister title the Lutterworth Observer comprises Editor in Chief Ian Hughes, deputy editor Andy Morris and Bullivant Media's Warwickshire & West Midlands area chief photographer Jon Mullis.

The Lutterworth Observer is a sister paper of the Rugby Observer and the editorial is produced at the same office located at 45, The Parade Leamington Spa, the central office for Bullivant Media's Warwickshire and West Midlands titles.
