= Mid Devon Advertiser =

British weekly local newspaper founded in 1863

- Type: Weekly newspaper
- Owner: Tindle Newspaper Group
- Founded: 1863; 162 years ago
- Headquarters: Newton Abbot
- Circulation: 2,803 (as of 2023)
- Sister newspapers: Dawlish Post; Teignmouth Post
- Website: middevonadvertiser.co.uk

The Mid Devon Advertiser is a local newspaper and media outlet based in Newton Abbot, Devon, and serving the surrounding area including Ashburton, Bovey Tracey, Moretonhampstead, Teignmouth, and Dawlish, in an area referred to as Teignbridge (UK Parliament constituency)|Mid Devon]] since the 1800s, but not to be confused with the Mid Devon district formed in the late 1970s North of Exeter. The paper is published weekly, on a Thursday.

== History ==
The paper was formed as the Newton Weekly Journal by James Welford, and run as a two-man operation, changing its name to the East & South Devon Advertiser in 1870.

The publication was sold a further two times in 1876 and 1906, and on the second of those sales saw the name change to the existing title.

Between 1969 and 1981 the paper changed hands four times, including time under the ownership of Beaverbrook Newspapers, Mirror Group, and a local consortium, before being bought by Tindle Newspaper Group.

Whilst part of the Mirror Group, in 1970, the Mid-Devon Times was merged into the paper, which was founded a few years after the Advertiser and was previously a competitor with a higher circulation.

In 1984, the Press Council rejected a complaint about the paper for publishing a photograph showing a dead body.

The title is now owned by Tindle, and continues to publish every Friday.
