= Teesdale Mercury =

Weekly newspaper in County Durham, UK

- Type: Weekly newspaper
- Founded: 1854
- Website: https://www.teesdalemercury.co.uk/

The Teesdale Mercury is a rural weekly newspaper in County Durham in the United Kingdom, which has been published since 1854. It is based in the town of Barnard Castle, and has printing facilities there, which were used to print the paper until it switched to colour in 2015. The paper, along with its sister publication the Wear Valley Mercury (now closed), was owned by Lord Barnard.

In 2024 the paper was sold to Andy Barr, owner of the Cumberland & Westmorland Herald, Keswick Reminder and the Cumbria Crack website.
