= Daltons Weekly =

Daltons Weekly was a newspaper published in the United Kingdom every Thursday until July 2011.

Established during the late 1860s by Herbert Dalton, Daltons Weekly was initially a single broadsheet listing 'Accommodation for Gentleman' in the then fashionable middle class suburbs around Vauxhall in South London. The paper proved very successful, but within two years of starting the paper, Dalton died, leaving it to his brother, who was a butcher and had no interest in publishing. The brother sold the paper to two brothers by the name of 'Hebert', for £100. For the next 102 years, Daltons Weekly remained a family business owned by the Heberts.

Over this period the paper grew and began to cover additional market sectors. In June 1972, the paper was purchased by Morgan Grampian Ltd, who focused on the three main market areas of holidays, property and businesses, and closed down unrelated sectors. In 1987 Morgan-Grampian was acquired by United News and Media, currently known as United Business Media. The Daltons brands were acquired by Innovare Media Ltd in 2012.

== Daltons Business ==
Established in 2002, Daltons Business is a UK database of businesses for sale, listing over 29,000 businesses, including franchises, commercial property and businesses abroad. Daltons Business has an average of 3,500,000 page impressions every month.

The website lists businesses for sale classified into the sectors of Agricultural Businesses, Care Businesses, Commercial Property,- Corporate Businesses, Distribution Companies, Entertainment and Leisure Businesses, Restaurants and Takeaway, Hotels, Internet Businesses, Manufacturing Businesses, Marine Businesses, Motor and Transport Businesses, Pubs, Retail Businesses, Service Businesses and Franchises.

== Daltons Holidays ==
Launched in 2003, Daltons Holidays listed holiday properties of all types worldwide. It generated an average of 500,000 page impressions through natural search and an average of 28,000 unique visitors, until its closure in September 2014.

== Daltons Property ==
Launched in 2004, Daltons Property listed properties for sale in the UK and abroad. Daltons Property generated an average of 350,000 monthly page impressions, and approximately 20,000 monthly unique visitors, until its closure in September 2014.
