= Milton Keynes Citizen =

- Type: Weekly newspaper
- Format: Tabloid
- Owner(s): National World
- Founder(s): Bill Alder
- Founded: 1981
- Language: English
- Headquarters: Bletchley (Milton Keynes)
- Circulation: 31,015 (as of 2023)
- Sister newspapers: Newspapers throughout the UK
- Website: www.miltonkeynes.co.uk

The Milton Keynes Citizen is the only freely distributed local newspaper in Milton Keynes. The newspaper is owned by National World.

The MK Citizen was founded by Bill Alder and Jerry West on 1 October 1981 and they sold to EMAP in 1987 and the purchase was completed in April 1990. EMAP sold the paper to Johnston Publishing in the 1990s. The newspaper had a circulation of 95,464 in 2000 and 97,714 in 2010.

== Distribution ==
The Milton Keynes Citizen is distributed freely across the City of Milton Keynes unitary authority area on Thursdays.

There was formerly a more limited circulation Tuesday sister paper, Citizen First which was distributed on Tuesdays (this was formerly the Citizen on Sunday but changed when MK News launched on Wednesdays). This is no longer published.

The paper's main print competitor was the MK News, part of LSN Media Ltd., which closed in October 2016.
