= The Spark (newspaper) =

Student newspaper of the University of Reading

- Type: Monthly newspaper
- Format: Compact (Tabloid)
- Owner(s): Reading University Students' Union
- Founded: 1934
- Headquarters: Reading University Students' Union Media Centre
- Circulation: 2,000
- Website: thesparkonline.org

The Spark is the student newspaper of the University of Reading in the United Kingdom

The Spark is produced monthly during term time (previously fortnightly) and is available as a paper edition distributed across University halls of residence, academic, and administrative buildings. The paper follows a traditional newspaper layout: the front portion of the newspaper is devoted to news issues, particularly those concerning students at the university.

== History ==
The Spark was established in 1934 as The Shell. In 1984, the newspaper changed format to a more magazine-style publication, rebranding itself as the short-lived Splat, before changing again to Spark* in 1988. Spark* reverted to a newspaper format in 1990, under the title Spark. At this point the newspaper was published weekly.

In 2006, the then Reading University Students' Union (RUSU) President Dave Lewis decided to have Spark* published fortnightly, to reduce costs and to give the volunteer staff more time between issues whilst completing their degrees. This move coincided with a move to printing in full colour and the rebranding as Spark*.

In a 2005 Independent article, a former Varsity editor described The Spark as 'about as visually appealing as a punch in the retina'. Since then, the newspaper has had a major redesign by University Typography and Graphic Communication students, and has upgraded its design software to Adobe InDesign CS3 .

== Awards ==
The Spark has been nominated by its editorial team for the Guardian Student Media Awards in a number of categories. In 2010, two writers, Georgina Mills and Marcus Greenslade, won first and second prizes respectively in Up to Speed's student journalism competition.

In November 2010, The Spark's (then known as 'Spark*') music editor Kate Allen received the gong for best student writer at the Record of the Day Awards 2010, which recognise contributions to music journalism.
