= Sami Swoi (magazine) =

- Bądź na bieżąco po swojemu!
- Type: News magazine
- Format: Magazine
- Owner: 1MM Media Ltd
- Editor-in-chief: Dariusz Chrost
- Editor: Sonia Grodek; Małgorzata Skibińska
- Staff writers: Bartosz Rajewski; Jacek Żakowski; Krystyna Kotlińska
- Founded: 12 July 2001
- Relaunched: 10 September 2021
- Language: Polish
- Headquarters: 60 The Mall
- City: London
- Country: England
- ISSN: 2754-2823
- Website: samiswoi.news

Sami Swoi (transl. The Polish Times; formerly Goniec Polski) is a monthly news magazine for the Polish community in the United Kingdom (UK) that is published in London. Sami Swoi is the oldest existing Polish language magazine in the UK.
