= Daily Post (North Wales) =

Welsh newspaper

- Type: Daily newspaper
- Owner: Reach plc
- Editor: Andrew Campbell
- Language: English
- Headquarters: Colwyn Bay
- Circulation: 6,843 (as of 2024)
- Website: www.dailypost.co.uk

The Daily Post is a daily newspaper for the North Wales region of Wales. Its website is branded North Wales Live. The newspaper gained independence from the Liverpool Daily Post in 2003, which later ceased production in December 2013.

It was based on Vale Road, Llandudno Junction, from 2001 to 2017. In May 2017, it moved to a base at Bryn Eirias on Colwyn Bay's Abergele Road. As of 2025, the newspaper's staff work entirely remote with no dedicated permanent office.
