= Scunthorpe Telegraph =

Newspaper

- Type: Weekly newspaper
- Owner: Reach plc
- Founded: 1937
- Circulation: 2,116 (as of 2025)
- Website: grimsbytelegraph.co.uk/all-about/scunthorpe

The Scunthorpe Telegraph is a local paid-for newspaper published and distributed weekly in Scunthorpe, England.

== History ==
The newspaper was launched on 8 September 1937. Prior to the Scunthorpe Telegraph's launch, the town was served by the Grimsby Evening Telegraph.

The Scunthorpe Telegraph and Grimsby Evening Telegraph and their associated websites became GSMG (Grimsby Scunthorpe Media Group) in 2007. In 2012, Local World acquired owner Northcliffe Media from Daily Mail and General Trust. The Scunthorpe Telegraph's editor is Jamie Macaskill.

Their reporters include David Elliott, Charlie Wilson, Jamie Waller and Paul Crute. Their photographer is David Haber.

The final edition of the Daily Scunthorpe Telegraph was printed on 12 August 2011, with the paper becoming a weekly from 18 August 2011.
