= St Helens Reporter =

- Type: Weekly newspaper
- Owner(s): Johnston Press
- Website: sthelensreporter.co.uk

The St Helens Reporter was a weekly paid-for newspaper in St Helens, Merseyside, England. The paper went digital only in 2015.
