= List of Reach plc titles =

Reach plc publishes many newspapers, magazines and news websites. This list of Reach plc titles is a non-exhaustive list of these. Before 2018, Reach plc was known as Trinity Mirror plc. The list includes titles owned by the Mirror Group Newspapers (MGN), and those owned by both M.E.N Media and S&B Media, after both companies were purchased by Trinity Mirror as GMG Regional Media from the Guardian Media Group in 2010.

== Mirror Group newspapers, M.E.N Media and S&B Media ==
=== National newspapers ===
- Daily Express / Sunday Express
- Daily Mirror / Sunday Mirror
- Daily Record / Sunday Mail (Scotland)
- Daily Star / Daily Star Sunday
- Irish Daily Mirror
- Irish Daily Star
- The Mirror US (United States)
- Sunday People
- Western Mail / Wales on Sunday (Wales)

=== Local and regional newspapers ===
Papers on the same line usually have generalised content and/or have the same team of reporters and editor.

==== East Midlands ====
- Derby Telegraph
- Hinckley Times
- Leicester Mercury
- Lincolnshire Echo
- Loughborough Echo
- Nottingham Post
- Retford Times
- Glossop Advertiser (sister paper of the Tameside Advertiser)

==== Greater London ====
- Barking & Dagenham Yellow Advertiser
- Bexley Mercury
- Brent & Wembley Leader
- Ealing Gazette
- Ealing Informer
- Ealing Leader
- Enfield Advertiser
- Enfield Gazette
- Fulham & Hammersmith Chronicle
- Haringey Advertiser
- Harrow & Wembley Observer
- Harrow Informer
- Harrow Leader
- Havering Yellow Advertiser (Romford)
- Hounslow Borough Chronicle
- Hounslow, Chiswick & Whitton Informer
- Ilford & Redbridge Yellow Advertiser
- Kensington & Chelsea Informer
- Lewisham & Greenwich Mercury
- Mitcham, Morden & Wimbledon Post
- The Press (Barnet and Hendon)
- Streatham, Clapham & West Norwood Post
- Sutton & Epsom Post
- Uxbridge & Hillingdon Leader
- Uxbridge Gazette
- The Wharf (Canary Wharf)

==== North East England ====
- Chronicle Extra (Newcastle upon Tyne)
- Evening Chronicle (Newcastle upon Tyne)
- The Journal (Newcastle upon Tyne)
- Sunday Sun (Newcastle Upon Tyne)

==== North West England ====
- Accrington Observer
- Anfield & Walton Star
- Bootle Times
- Chester Chronicle
- Colne Valley Chronicle
- Crewe Chronicle
- Crosby Herald
- Ellesmere Port Pioneer
- Formby Times
- Heywood Advertiser
- Liverpool Echo
- Maghull Star
- Manchester Evening News
- Manchester Metro News
- Middleton Guardian
- North East Manchester Advertiser
- Oldham Advertiser
- Ormskirk Advertiser
- Prestwich Advertiser
- Rochdale Observer
- Rossendale Free Press
- Runcorn & Widnes World
- Salford Advertiser
- South Liverpool Merseymart
- South Manchester Reporter
- Southport Visiter
- Stockport Express / Macclesfield Express / Wilmslow Express / The Sentinel (Staffordshire)
- Tameside Advertiser (sister paper of the Glossop Advertiser)

==== Scotland ====
- Airdrie and Coatbridge Advertiser
- Ayrshire Post
- Blairgowrie Advertiser
- Dumfries & Galloway Standard
- East Kilbride News
- Galloway News
- The Glaswegian
- Hamilton Advertiser
- Irvine Herald
- Kilmarnock Standard
- The Lennox Herald
- Metro Scotland
- Paisley Daily Express
- Perthshire Advertiser
- Rutherglen Reformer
- Scottish Business Insider
- Stirling Observer
- Strathearn Herald
- West Lothian Courier
- Wishaw Press

==== South East England ====
- Bracknell Standard
- The Crawley News
- Dover Express
- Slough Express
- Staines Informer
- Surrey Advertiser
- Surrey Herald
- Surrey Mirror Advertiser
- Walton & Weybridge Informer

==== South West England ====
- Bath Chronicle
- Bristol Post
- Cornish Guardian
- The Cornishman
- Express & Echo (Exeter)
- Gloucester Citizen
- Gloucestershire Echo
- The Herald (Plymouth)
- Mid Devon Gazette
- North Devon Journal
- The West Briton (Cornwall)
- Western Morning News, regional title covering Devon, Cornwall, Dorset, Somerset & Isles of Scilly

==== Wales ====
- Daily Post (North Wales)
- South Wales Echo
- South Wales Evening Post

==== West Midlands ====
- Birmingham Post / Birmingham Mail / Sunday Mercury
- Burton Mail
- Coventry Telegraph

==== Yorkshire and the Humber ====
- Grimsby Telegraph
- Huddersfield District Chronicle
- Huddersfield Daily Examiner
- Hull Daily Mail
- Scunthorpe Telegraph

== Digital online brands ==
Reach has launched websites under the Live brand, a number of which (linked below) serving as the website for a pre-existing print newspaper:

- Belfast Live
- Birmingham Live
- Bristol Live
- Buzz.ie (50% owned)
- Cheshire Live
- CorkBeo
- Cornwall Live
- Devon Live
- Dublin Live
- Edinburgh Live
- Yorkshire Live
- football.london
- Glasgow Live
- Grimsby Live
- Hampshire Live
- Hull Live
- Lancs Live
- Leeds Live
- Leicestershire Live
- Lincolnshire Live
- MyLondon
- Northants Live
- Plymouth Live
- RSVPLive
- Somerset Live
- Surrey Live
- Sussex Live
- Teesside Live
- WalesOnline

Other Reach non-news websites include:

- Hopsmore Craft Beer Club
- Memory Lane
- InYourArea
- Fish4Jobs

== Defunct titles ==
=== Scotland ===
- Aberdeen Live (2021–2026)
- GalwayBeo (2021–2026)

=== South East England ===
- Buckinghamshire Examiner (1889–2019)
- Kent Live (2016–2026)
- Reading Post (1965–2015)

=== Wales ===
- Neath Guardian (1925–2009)

== Previously owned titles ==
It used to own a 43% share of The Independent.

It owned the News Letter, Donegal Democrat and Derry Journal until late 2003 when they were sold to the newly formed Local Press Ltd which was then sold to Johnston Press which was then acquired by JPIMedia.
