= List of newspapers in Scotland =

This is a list of newspapers in Scotland.

== Daily newspapers ==
Title	Market type	Print	Location	Format	Scottish circulation 2017	Scottish circulation 2016	Scottish circulation 2015	Foundation date
The Herald	Scottish – Quality	Morning	Scottish	Broadsheet	25,869	28,872	32,141	1783
The Scotsman	Scottish – Quality	Morning	Scottish	Compact	19,792	19,449	22,740	1817
The National	Scottish – Mid Market	Morning	Scottish	Compact	9,746	8,496	12,124	2014
Daily Record	Scottish – Popular	Morning	Scottish	Tabloid				1895
The Press and Journal	Regional	Morning	Scottish	Compact	48,208	51,880	56,422	1747
The Courier	Regional	Morning	Scottish	Compact	35,813	39,324	43,031	1801
Greenock Telegraph	Local	Morning	Scottish	Tabloid	8,959	9,555	10,511	1857
Paisley Daily Express	Local	Morning	Scottish	Tabloid	4,508	4,800	5,109	1874
Evening Express	Local – Aberdeen	Evening	Scottish	Tabloid	22,736	25,744	28,802	1879
Glasgow Times	Local – Glasgow	Evening	Scottish	Tabloid	20,874	23,696	27,733	1876
Edinburgh Evening News	Local	Evening	Scottish	Tabloid	16,660	18,362	21,803	1873
Evening Telegraph	Local – Dundee	Evening	Scottish	Tabloid	13,321	14,971	16,855	1877
The Times (Scottish edition)	UK – Quality	Morning	Scottish edition of UK newspaper	Compact				1785
The Daily Telegraph (Scottish edition)	UK – Quality	Morning	Scottish edition of UK newspaper	Broadsheet				1855
i	UK – Quality	Morning	UK newspaper widely available in Scotland	Compact				2010
The Guardian	UK – Quality	Morning	UK newspaper widely available in Scotland	Tabloid				1821
The Financial Times	UK – Quality	Morning	UK newspaper widely available in Scotland	Broadsheet				1888
Scottish Daily Mail	UK – Mid Market	Morning	Scottish edition of UK newspaper	Tabloid				1896
Scottish Daily Express	UK – Mid Market	Morning	Scottish edition of UK newspaper	Tabloid				1900
The Scottish Sun	UK – Popular	Morning	Scottish edition of UK newspaper	Tabloid				1964
Daily Star of Scotland	UK – Popular	Morning	Scottish edition of UK newspaper	Tabloid				1978
Scottish Daily Mirror	UK – Popular	Morning	Scottish edition of UK newspaper	Tabloid				1903
Metro, Scottish Edition	UK – Free	Morning	Scottish edition of UK newspaper	Tabloid				1999
The Morning Star	UK – Mid Market	Morning	Scottish edition of UK newspaper	Tabloid				1930

Traditionally newspapers could be divided into 'quality', serious-minded newspapers (usually referred to as 'broadsheets' due to their large size) and 'tabloids', or less serious newspapers. However, these definitions no longer apply, as several 'quality' papers in Scotland have followed the lead of The Independent by adopting a tabloid format (which some prefer to refer to as 'compact' to avoid being associated with their more downmarket peers). In Scotland, two broadsheet newspapers have made the switch to 'compact' format. The Scotsman did so in August 2004, and the Sunday Herald followed in November 2005.

In addition to newspapers published in Scotland, including Scottish editions of United Kingdom newspapers, a number of local newspapers published in other parts of the British Isles are widely available.

== Sunday newspapers ==
Title	Market type	Location	Format	Scottish circulation
Scotland on Sunday	Scottish – Quality	Scottish	Broadsheet	16,289
The Sunday Post	Scottish – Mid Market	Scottish	Tabloid	123,393
Sunday Mail	Scottish – Popular	Scottish	Tabloid	140,743
Sunday National	Mid Market (pro-independence)	Scottish	Broadsheet	
The Sunday Times Scotland	UK – Quality	Scottish edition of UK newspaper	Broadsheet	46,593
The Observer	UK – Quality	UK newspaper widely available in Scotland	Tabloid	11,772
The Sunday Telegraph Scotland	UK – Quality	Scottish edition of UK newspaper	Broadsheet	11,234
Mail on Sunday Scotland	UK – Mid Market	Scottish edition of UK newspaper	Tabloid	63,290
Scottish Sunday Express	UK – Mid Market	Scottish edition of UK newspaper	Tabloid	21,661
Sun on Sunday	UK – Popular	UK newspaper widely available in Scotland	Tabloid	142,272
Daily Star Sunday	UK – Popular	UK newspaper widely available in Scotland	Tabloid	19,299
Scottish Sunday Mirror	UK – Popular	Scottish edition of UK newspaper	Tabloid	7,523
The Sunday People	UK – Popular	UK newspaper widely available in Scotland	Tabloid	4,656

== Local weekly newspapers ==
=== Aberdeenshire ===
- Banffshire Journal
- The Buchanie
- Deeside Piper
- Donside Piper
- Ellon Times & East Gordon Advertiser
- Fraserburgh Herald
- Huntly Express
- Inverurie Herald
- Kincardineshire Observer
- Mearns Leader

=== Angus ===
- Angus County Press

=== Argyll and Bute ===
- Campbeltown Courier & Argyllshire Advertiser
- Dunoon Observer and Argyllshire Standard
- Helensburgh Advertiser
- Isle of Bute News
- The Ileach
- Oban Times

=== Clackmannanshire ===
- Alloa & Hillfoots Advertiser

=== Dumfries and Galloway ===
- Annandale Herald & Moffat News
- Annandale Observer
- Dumfries & Galloway Standard (bi-weekly)
- Dumfries Courier
- Eskdale and Liddesdale Advertiser
- Galloway Gazette
- Galloway News
- Stranraer and Wigtownshire Free Press

=== East Ayrshire ===
- Cumnock Chronicle
- Kilmarnock Standard

=== East Dunbartonshire ===
- Kirkintilloch Herald
- Milngavie & Bearsden Herald

=== East Lothian ===
- East Lothian Courier

=== East Renfrewshire ===
- Barrhead News

=== Edinburgh ===
- Linlithgow Gazette - incorporating Bo'ness Journal and Queensferry Gazette

=== Falkirk ===
- Linlithgow Gazette - incorporating Bo'ness Journal and Queensferry Gazette
- Falkirk Herald - the largest local weekly newspaper in Scotland in terms of circulation and readership

=== Fife ===
- Central Fife Times and Advertiser – weekly tabloid newspaper and classified advertiser in the Cowdenbeath, Kelty and Lochgelly area
- Dunfermline Press – weekly tabloid newspaper for West Fife
- East Fife Mail – tabloid weekly sister paper of Fife Free Press for the Levenmouth area
- Fife Free Press – weekly tabloid newspaper for the Kirkcaldy area
- Fife Herald
- Glenrothes Gazette (Leslie and Markinch News) – tabloid sister weekly paper of Fife Free Press
- St Andrews Citizen

=== Glasgow ===
- The Digger – scandal sheet with stories of minor trials and arrests and gossip about local gangs
- Glasgow South & Eastwood Extra
- Glasgow Eyes – a picture news magazine featuring street/reportage photography/news/music and showbiz

=== Highlands ===
- Caithness Courier
- The Inverness Courier (bi-weekly)
- John O'Groat Journal
- Oban Times incorporating the Lochaber Times
- The Northern Times
- Rossshire Journal
- Strathspey & Badenoch Herald
- Ullapool News
- West Highland Free Press

=== Midlothian ===
- Midlothian Advertiser (formerly Dalkeith Advertiser)

=== Moray ===
- Banffshire Advertiser
- Banffshire Journal
- Forres Gazette
- Northern Scot

=== North Ayrshire ===
- Ardrossan & Saltcoats Herald
- Arran Banner
- Irvine Herald & Kilwinning Chronicle
- Irvine Times
- Largs and Millport Weekly News

=== North Lanarkshire ===
- Airdrie & Coatbridge Advertiser
- Cumbernauld News & Kilsyth Chronicle
- Motherwell Times & Bellshill Speaker
- Wishaw Press

=== Orkney ===
- The Orcadian

=== Perth and Kinross ===
- Blairgowrie Advertiser
- Perthshire Advertiser (bi-weekly)
- Strathearn Herald

=== Renfrewshire ===
- Gryffe Advertizer
- Paisley and Renfrewshire Gazette

=== Scottish Borders ===
- Berwickshire News
- Border Telegraph
- The Hawick Paper
- Peeblesshire News
- Southern Reporter

=== Shetland ===
- Shetland Times

=== South Ayrshire ===
- Ayr Advertiser incorporating Carrick Gazette & Troon Times
- Ayrshire Post

=== South Lanarkshire ===
- East Kilbride News
- Hamilton Advertiser
- Lanark & Carluke Gazette
- Rutherglen Reformer
- Strathaven Echoes

=== Stirling ===
- Stirling News
- Stirling Observer (bi-weekly)

=== West Dunbartonshire ===
- Clydebank Post
- Dumbarton and Vale of Leven Reporter
- Lennox Herald

=== West Lothian ===
- Linlithgow Gazette - incorporating Bo'ness Journal and Queensferry Gazette
- West Lothian Courier

=== Western Isles ===
- Stornoway Gazette

== Specialist newspapers ==
- The i-Witness - Muslim paper in English
- The Pink Paper - Edinburgh soccer paper, which shares its name with a separate gay and lesbian publication
- Scots Independent - mainly supporting the Scottish National Party (SNP)
- Scottish Catholic Observer
- Scottish Socialist Voice - printed by the Scottish Socialist Party (SSP)
- Third Force News - newspaper serving the voluntary sector, non-party-political

=== UK-wide specialist newspapers widely available in Scotland ===
- The Economist - weekly news-focused magazine owned by Pearson PLC, founded by Scot James Wilson
- PinkNews - LGBT online newspaper
- Private Eye - Fortnightly satirical current affairs news magazine
- The Jewish Chronicle - aimed at Britain's Jewish community
- Racing Post – daily horse racing, greyhound racing and sports betting newspaper

== University newspapers ==
- Brig – University of Stirling
- Gaudie – University of Aberdeen (see: Aberdeen University Students' Association)
- The Glasgow Guardian – University of Glasgow
- The Journal – University of Edinburgh, Heriot-Watt University, Edinburgh Napier University, Queen Margaret University, Edinburgh College of Art, University of Strathclyde and the University of Glasgow
- The EDIT - Glasgow Caledonian University
- The Magdalen – University of Dundee (see: Dundee University Students' Association)
- qmunicate – University of Glasgow's Queen Margaret Union
- The Saint – University of St Andrews
- Strathclyde Telegraph – University of Strathclyde
- Student – University of Edinburgh
- Veritas – Napier University

== Defunct newspapers ==
- Aberdeen Citizen
- Allanwater Herald
- An Gàidheal Ùr - for speakers of Scottish Gaelic (monthly)
- Arbroath Herald
- Brechin Advertiser
- The Bulletin
- Business am
- The Buteman
- Carnoustie Guide & Gazette
- The Citizen
- East Lothian News
- Edinburgh Advertiser
- Edinburgh Courant
- Ellon Advertiser
- Fife & Kinross Extra
- Forfar Dispatch
- Glasgow Argus
- Glasgow Evening News
- The Gourock Times
- Hawick News
- The Highlander
- Highland News
- Inverness Herald
- Inverurie Advertiser
- Kirriemuir Herald
- Lothian and Peebles Times
- Mercurius Caledonius
- Montrose Review
- Nairnshire Telegraph
- North Ayrshire World
- The North Briton
- North Star
- Paisley People
- Perth Shopper
- Rossshire Herald
- Scottish Daily News
- Scottish Guardian
- Scottish Leader (3 January 1887 – 4 July 1894) - Edinburgh-based daily, Liberal and pro-home rule, established in competition with The Scotsman
- Scottish Standard
- Selkirk Advertiser
- Strathkelvin Advertiser
- Sunday Scot
- Sunday Standard
- Turriff Advertiser
- West Lothian Herald & Post

== See also ==
- List of newspapers in the United Kingdom
- List of magazines published in Scotland
- Media in Scotland
- Newspapers
- List of Scotland-related topics
- History of British newspapers
- List of left-wing publications in the United Kingdom
- List of right-wing publications in the United Kingdom
