= The Advertiser =

The Advertiser is the name of a number of newspapers around the world:

== Australia ==
- Ararat Advertiser, a regional newspaper in Ararat, Victoria published by Australian Community Media (ACM)
- Bendigo Advertiser (1853–), a daily newspaper in Bendigo, Victoria published by ACM
- Melbourne Advertiser (1838–1848), a defunct newspaper in Melbourne, Victoria
- The Advertiser (Adelaide) (1858–), a daily News Corporation tabloid in Adelaide, South Australia
- The Advertiser (Bairnsdale) (1877–), a regional newspaper in Bairnsdale, Victoria
- The Advertiser, a regional newspaper in Cessnock, New South Wales published by ACM
- The Footscray Advertiser (1874–1882) a weekly newspaper in Footscray, Victoria
- The Advertiser (Hurstbridge) (1922–1939), the name of a defunct newspaper in north-east Melbourne first published as the Evelyn Observer
- Wollongong Advertiser (1982–), a regional newspaper in Wollongong, New South Wales published by ACM
- The Advertiser (1921–1932), a tri-weekly newspaper in Fremantle, Western Australia that incorporated the Fremantle Times and the Fremantle Herald (the 1913–1919 incarnation)

== United Kingdom ==
- The name of several local newspapers owned by Archant
- Surrey Advertiser, a weekly newspaper in Surrey, England
- Advertiser, titles from the Greater Manchester Weekly Newspapers Group
  - Glossop Advertiser
  - Oldham Advertiser
  - Tameside Advertiser

== Elsewhere ==
- The Advertiser, a twice-weekly newspaper in Grand Falls-Windsor, Newfoundland and Labrador, Canada
- Anderson Valley Advertiser, a weekly newspaper in Anderson Valley, California, United States
- Daily Advertiser, Lafayette, Louisiana, United States

== See also ==
- Advertiser (disambiguation)
- The Daily Advertiser (disambiguation)
