= East Kilbride News =

Scottish newspaper

- Owner: Reach plc
- Founded: 1952
- Circulation: 823 (as of 2023)
- Website: dailyrecord.co.uk

The East Kilbride News is a Scottish newspaper covering the East Kilbride area. It is the longest-running newspaper dedicated to the town's news stories, and to a lesser extent the stories of adjoining areas. The paper is currently owned by Reach plc and now exists mostly in name, as its content reflects that duplicated by Lanarkshire Live and the main title of the higher Daily Record group, all owned by Reach PLC. As of 2026, a hard copy titled 'East Kilbride News' is still sold in limited circulation within the town of East Kilbride.

== History ==
The East Kilbride News began in 1952 as a supplement of the Cambuslang Advertiser, and is the longest local newspaper dedicated to the East Kilbride area. The news title with the most enduring coverage of East Kilbride affairs is the Hamilton Advertiser (fd. 1857), although this historically covered the news of several dozen localities. Although traditionally tracing its origins to 1952, and with archival sources supporting this date, the earliest issues of East Kilbride News make reference to their East Kilbride coverage earlier still, possibly as early as 1951, thereby suggesting that the East Kilbride News, in some form or another, existed earlier. This earlier material is not extant in known archival collection.

East Kilbride News first started out of a small office in nearby Cambuslang, and was sold for 2d. It later opened an office in the town in 1967, though it took the form of a small counter in the W. and R. Holmes bookshop, which was situated in Righead Gate, with a couple of small office rooms upstairs. Around 15 months later, the East Kilbride News was one of the first firms to move into Alexandra House, which in the 1980s became become part of Olympia House above the Olympia Arcade, in East Kilbride Shopping Centre. A door gave direct access from the arcade itself. The news remained there until July 2009, when Scottish and Universal Newspapers centralised their South Lanarkshire Operations, including the Hamilton Advertiser and Rutherglen Reformer, into an office in Hamilton, South Lanarkshire. The newspaper later became associated with the general Daily Record Group as a local outlet for news, still under the name of East Kilbride News. Later, all titles and more were absorbed into Reach PLC.
