= Norman Kennedy =

Norman Kennedy may refer to:

- Norman Kennedy (politician), trade unionist and politician in Ireland
- Norman Kennedy (rugby union) (1881–1960), Scottish rugby union player
