= Blairgowrie =

Blairgowrie may refer to:

- Blairgowrie, Perth and Kinross, a town in Scotland now part of the burgh of Blairgowrie and Rattray
  - Blairgowrie Advertiser, a newspaper
  - Blairgowrie Community Hospital
  - Blairgowrie High School, a secondary school
  - Blairgowrie railway station, a former railway station
- Blairgowrie, Victoria, Australia
- Blairgowrie, Gauteng, South Africa

== Sports ==
- Blairgowrie F.C., an association football team based in Scotland
- Blairgowrie Amateurs F.C., a former association football team based in Scotland (1912–1947)
- Blairgowrie RFC, a rugby union team based in Scotland
- Our Boys F.C. (Blairgowrie), a former association football team based in Scotland (1882–1912)
