= William M'Dowall =

Scottish antiquarian

- Born: 21 July 1815; Maxwelltown, Kirkcudbrightshire
- Died: 28 October 1888 (aged 73); Dumfries
- Occupation: Antiquarian

William M'Dowall (21 July 1815 – 28 October 1888) was a Scottish journalist and antiquarian.

== Biography ==
M'Dowall was born at Maxwelltown, Kirkcudbrightshire, 21 July 1815, was son of a traveller for a cabinet-making firm. Receiving a good school education in Dumfries, he learned bookbinding there, and enlarged his experience in Glasgow and London. 1843, on becoming a free churchman, he was appointed to the editorial staff of the ‘Scottish Herald,’ an Edinburgh free church paper, and was afterwards for a short time reporter on the ‘Banner of Ulster.’ In 1846 he became editor of the Dumfries and Galloway Standard, and with a short interval, during which he edited a Sunderland paper, about 1853–4, M'Dowall conducted the ‘Galloway Standard’ till his death, raising it to an influential position. A public-spirited citizen, he was connected with all the leading institutions of his burgh, and in his ‘History of Dumfries,’ 1867 (enlarged in 1873), he produced a most valuable record. He died at Dumfries, 28 October 1888. He was twice married, and his second wife survives him.

M'Dowall displays grace of fancy and expression in ‘The Man of the Woods and other Poems,’ published in 1844, 2nd edit. 1882. Two chapters of his ‘History of Dumfries,’ relating to Burns, were separately issued in 1870 as ‘Burns in Dumfriesshire.’ In 1876, he published ‘Memorials of St. Michael's Churchyard,’ a compilation of antiquarian and biographical importance. His ‘Mind in the Face,’ which appeared in 1882, and reached a third edition in 1888, is a substantial contribution to the literature of physiognomy. M'Dowall's sumptuous and exhaustive volume, ‘Chronicles of Lincluden, as an Abbey and as a College,’ was published in 1886, and his last work, issued in 1888, is a study of ballad-writers, entitled ‘Among the Old Scottish Minstrels.’
