= Tweeddale Press Group =

The Tweeddale Press Group was a newspaper and magazine publisher in the Scottish Borders. It evolved from the newspapers owned by successive generations of the Richardson, later Smail, family, from 1808. It became a subsidiary of Johnston Press in 1999, and was dissolved in 2020 following the liquidation of Johnston Press.

== History ==
The Berwick Advertiser was established in 1808 and moved into premises at 90 Marygate, Berwick-upon-Tweed in 1900. Tweeddale Press Group was formed in 1950 when Berwick Advertiser owner Major J.I.M. Smail bought the Southern Reporter. The group took over the Berwickshire News in 1957. In 1999, the Smail family sold the Tweeddale Press Group to Johnston Press.

== Current titles ==
Under Johnston Press ownership, the group published the following titles:

- Berwick Advertiser
- Berwickshire News
- Carrick Gazette
- East Lothian News
- Galloway Gazette
- Hawick News
- Lothian Times
- Midlothian Advertiser
- Musselburgh News
- Selkirk Weekend Advertiser
- Southern Reporter
- Peebles Times

== Previous titles ==
Tweeddale Press Group previously owned and published other titles:

- Morpeth Herald was acquired by the group in 1983, then sold to Northeast Press in 1992.
- Ponteland Observer was bought by the group in 1984, with the last edition being published in January 1986 then merged with the Morpeth Herald.
- Alnwick Advertiser, founded by the group in 1979, was sold to Northeast Press in 1992 and immediately merged with their Northumberland Gazette.
- Kelso Chronicle and Jedburgh Gazette, an amalgamation of several previous titles, itself merged with the Southern Reporter in 1983.
