= Robert Burns' skull =

Human skull

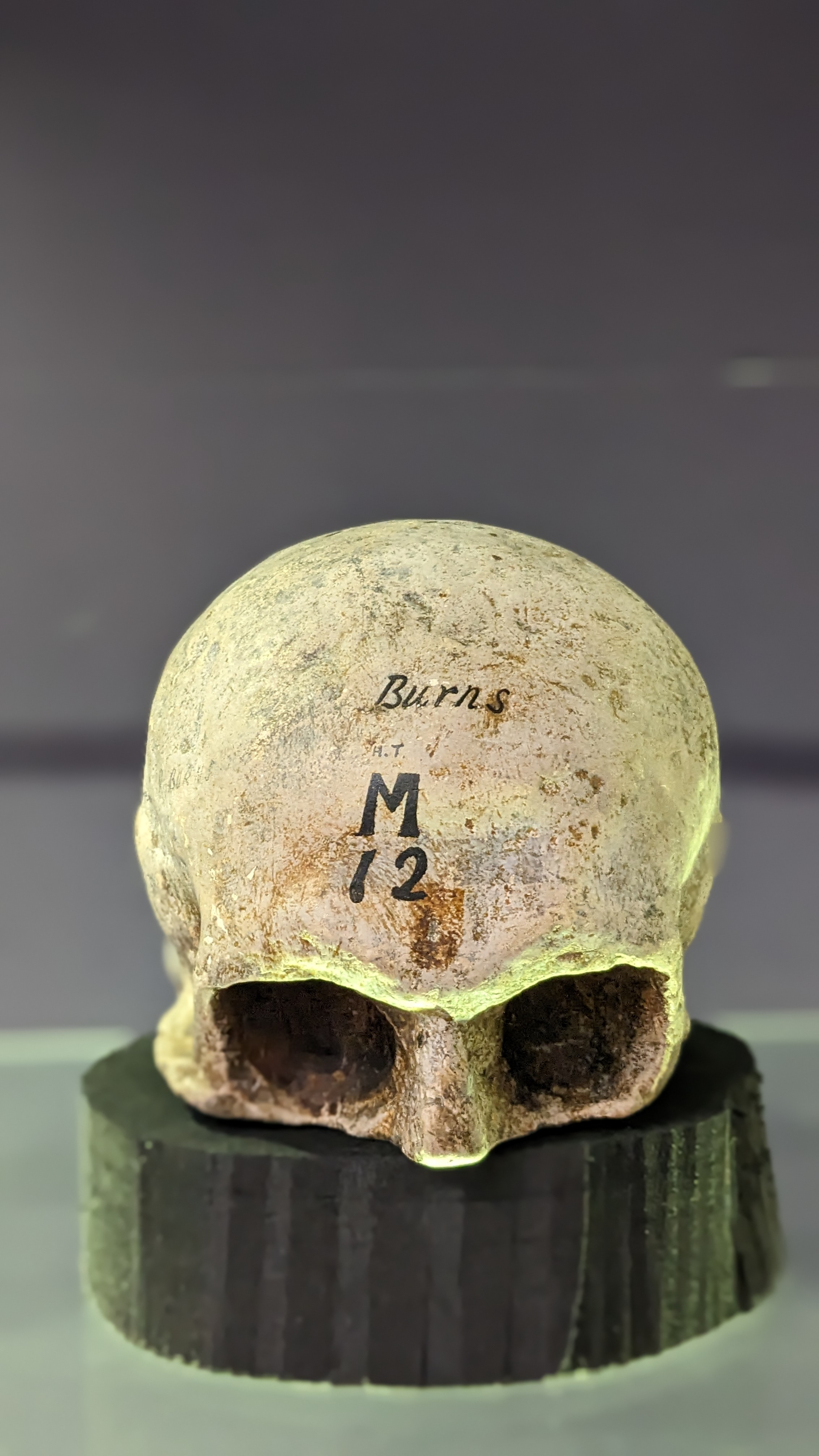
Cast of the skull of Scottish poet Robert Burns (front) - held at the Anatomical Museum, Edinburgh.

In 1834, Robert Burns' skull was exhumed and multiple casts were made from the head of Scotland's national bard.

In the early 19th century, phrenology, a pseudo-science involving the measuring of skulls to predict an individual's personality was widely believed. As a national figure and well known for his works and public persona, Burns' skull was of great interest to phrenologists at the time.

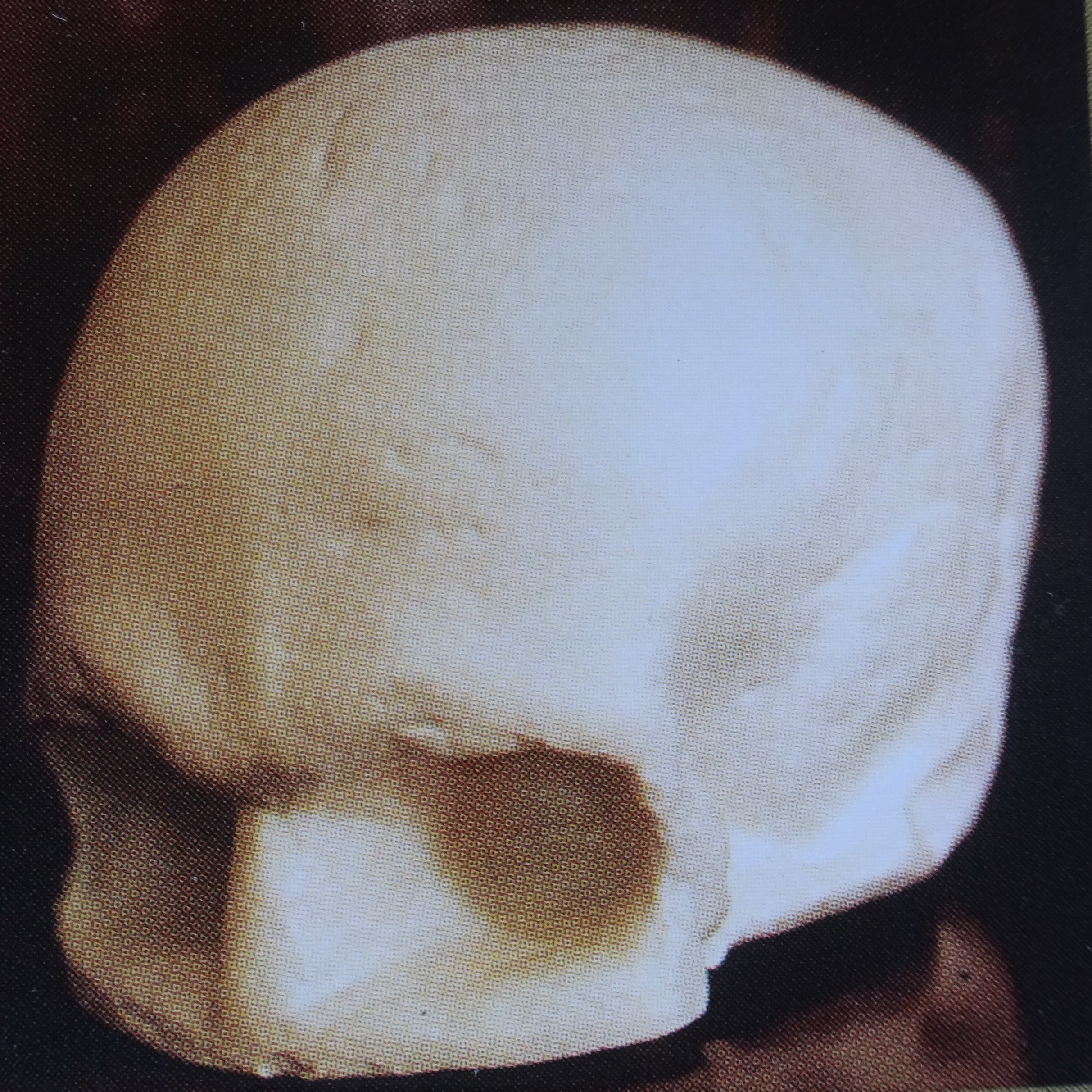
Cast of the skull in the possession of the Irvine Burns Club

== Interment to the Burns Mausoleum ==
Burns died 21 July 1796 and was buried in St. Michael's Churchyard in Dumfries. A mausoleum in the same cemetery was erected 19 years after his death and his body was relocated to the new tomb.

John McDiarmid, editor of the Dumfries Courier, reported on the removal of Burns from his original resting place though he arrived two years after the event. McDiarmid had an interest in phrenology and wished to make an examination of the Burns' skull.

== Exhumation of the skull ==
The opportunity to examine Burns' skull arose when Jean Armour, Burns' widow, died on 26 March 1834. The Burns Mausoleum was to be reopened to inter Armour's body on 1 April 1834.

McDiarmid was supposedly granted permission to exhume Burns's body by Armour's brother, Robert Armour. However, on review of newspaper coverage of the time and with the exhumation being performed at night and in secret, historians now doubt whether consent was given.

A group was led by McDiarmid and Archibald Blacklock, a local surgeon with an interest in phrenology. Other members included Adam Rankine, James Kerr, James Bogie, Andrew Crombie and their assistants.

The group attempted to entered the mausoleum at 7pm 31 March 1834. There were many people present in the graveyard and they decided to try again later that evening when it would be quieter. Upon opening the coffin casket, Blacklock made an assessment of the skull in the tomb.

The group then removed the skull and took it to James Fraser, a local plasterer of Queensbury Street, Dumfries. The skull was later returned to the tomb.

=== Assessment of the cast by George Combe ===
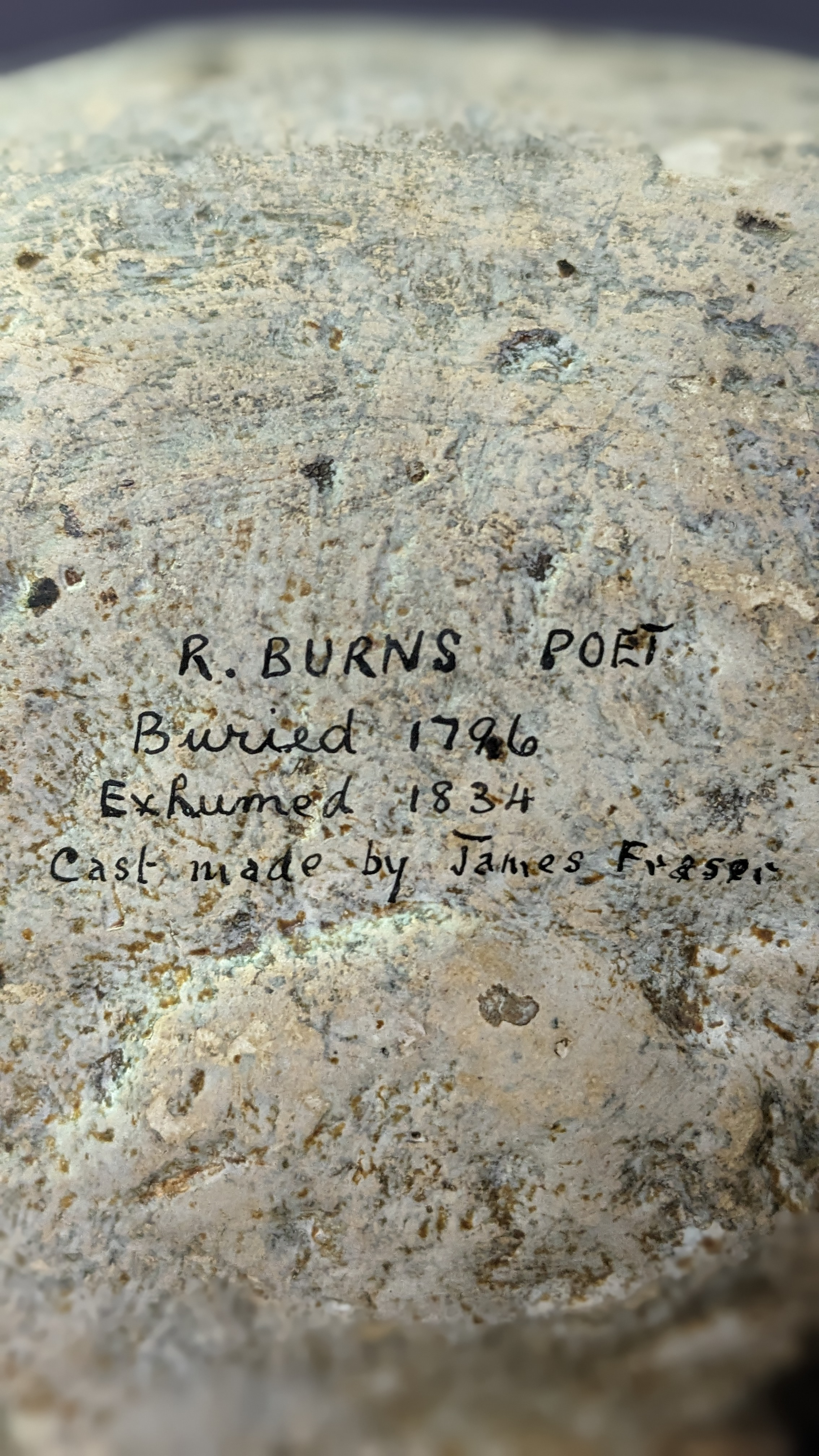
Cast of the skull of Scottish poet Robert Burns after his exhumation in 1834 (back) - held by the Anatomical Museum, Edinburgh.

A plaster cast was sent to George Combe, a Scottish lawyer and practitioner of phrenology based in Edinburgh. Combe published a report about his findings, entitled ‘Phrenological development of Robert Burns. From a cast on his skull moulded at Dumfries, the 31st day of March, 1834’.

Combe's analysis of the skull:

The Skull indicates the combination of strong animal passions, with equally powerful moral emotions. If the natural morality had been less, the endowment of the propensities is sufficient to have constituted a character of the most desperate description.

== Number of plaster casts ==
It is unknown how many casts were made by Fraser, with some sources reporting three were made.

Six casts are known to exist today though some may be copies of the original cast.

- Anatomical Museum, University of Edinburgh
- The Hunterian, University of Glasgow
- Writer's Museum, a museum in Edinburgh
- Dumfries Museum
- East Ayrshire Museums
- National Trust for Scotland's Robert Burns Birthplace Museum
