= Nicon House =

Building in Enfield, London, England

Coordinates: 51.6537°N 0.0804°W

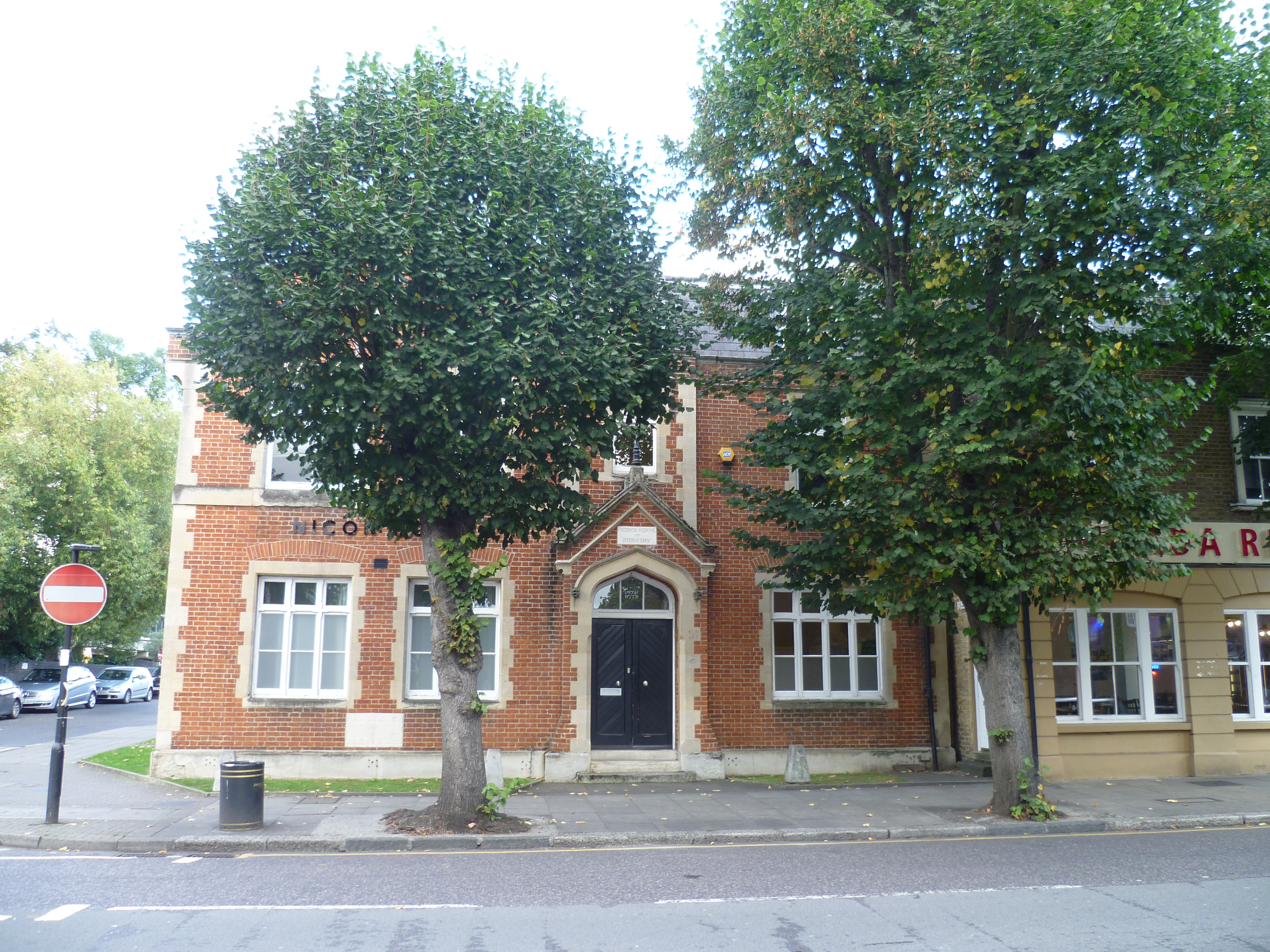
Nicon House from Silver Street

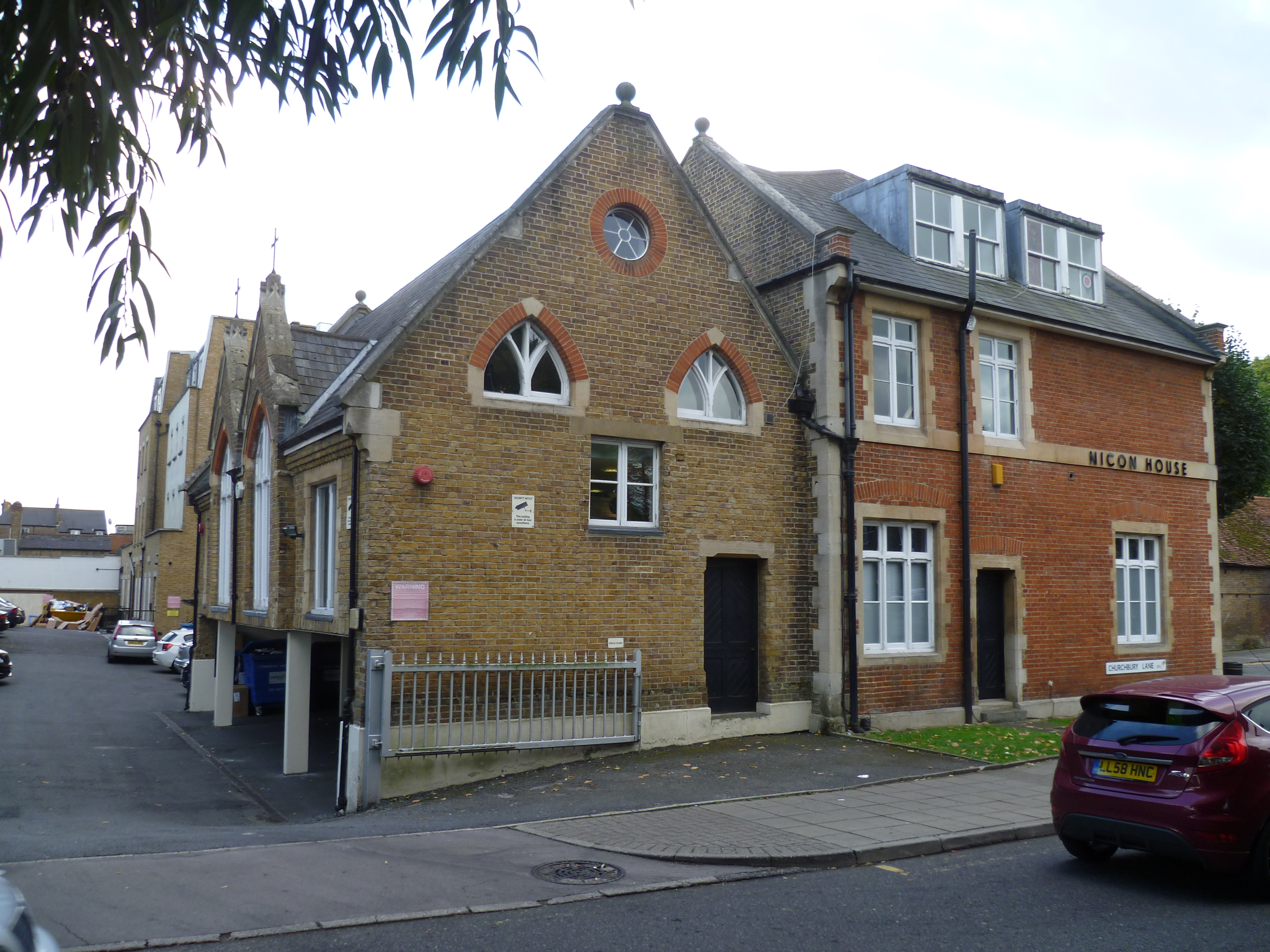
Churchbury Lane elevation.

Nicon House is an office building at 45 Silver Street, Enfield, London, that until 1911 was the Church of England Girls' School of Industry. It was then used as a boys' preparatory school and subsequently, until 1984, as the offices and printing works of the Enfield Gazette.
