= Glasgow Courant =

The 'Glasgow Courant' was a newspaper printed in Glasgow from 1715. It is the first newspaper to have been printed in Glasgow.

== History ==
The newspaper was first printed on 14 November 1715 in "Glasgow College", the precursor to the University of Glasgow. The printer was Donald Govan, who was printer to the university. The publisher was Robert Thomson, who was then postmaster of Glasgow. It was published three times a week, and sold for three half-pence, or "one penny to regular customers.

In the prospectus it was said to be:

For the use of the country round; any gentleman, or minister, or any other who wants them may have them at the University Printing House, or at the Post Office.

A set of the newspaper, consisting of 67 numbers, was shown at the Old Glasgow Exhibition held in 1894.

Two complete sets of the papers are preserved in Glasgow. One is in the possession of the University of Glasgow, and the other in the Mitchell Library.

== See also ==
- List of newspapers in Scotland
