= Ponteland Observer =

The Ponteland Observer was a weekly newspaper that circulated in the village of Ponteland in Northumberland in north-east England, and later the southern part of the borough of Castle Morpeth as well as some of the north-western suburbs of Newcastle upon Tyne, from 1 October 1982 until 9 January 1986.

It was originally owned by Ponteland Observer Ltd, a company belonging to Michael Sharman, its first editor, who was at the same time editor of the Hexham Courant owned by Cumbrian Newspapers Ltd. Unlike other paid-for weeklies in Northumberland it was a tabloid and was not part of a larger newspaper group. At that time the only weekly newspaper to pay attention to Ponteland was the 'Ponteland edition' of the Alnwick-based Northumberland Gazette. A circulation of 2000 was claimed by the time Sharman left the Courant early in 1984, but in May that year he was found dead in his office shortly before his plans to launch a sister title to the Observer in Gosforth could be brought to fruition; a verdict of suicide was reached.

The newspaper was bought by the Tweeddale Press Group, based in Berwick upon Tweed, with effect from 18 May 1984. From 5 July 1984 it became a broadsheet newspaper "incorporated with the Morpeth Herald" - meaning that the Observer was effectively an edition of the Herald, with the front page and some interior pages changed. This arrangement ended formally from the 6 September 1984 edition, but in fact much copy continued to be shared with the Herald, and occasionally with other Tweeddale Press titles, especially the Alnwick Advertiser.

At the end of 1985 the Tweeddale Press Group decided that the Observer, with a circulation of just 1200, would never be viable, and decided to close the newspaper and its Ponteland office; the last edition was published on 9 January 1986, after which it was amalgamated with the Morpeth Herald, which until April 2021 still retained "incorporating the Ponteland Observer" on its masthead, despite subsequent changes of editor and ownership.
