= Morpeth Herald =

Local Newspaper in Northumberland, England

- Type: Weekly newspaper
- Format: Tabloid
- Owner(s): National World
- Editor: Amanda Bourn
- Founded: 1854
- Circulation: 421 (as of 2023)
- Website: morpethherald.co.uk

The Morpeth Herald is a weekly newspaper published in Morpeth, Northumberland, England. The newspaper serves Morpeth, Ponteland, Pegswood, Ellington, Lynemouth, Widdrington Station and the outlying districts.

== History ==
A broadsheet, established in 1854 as a monthly and becoming weekly in 1858. It was printed and published in Morpeth by successive generations of the Mackay family until 1983, when the title was acquired by the Tweeddale Press Group, based in Berwick upon Tweed, where printing then moved, though it was still edited from an office above the Mackays' shop in Morpeth for several years, before moving to separate offices nearby. From 1984 some of its editorials was shared with the Ponteland Observer, acquired by the Tweeddale Press Group that year; it incorporated the Ponteland Observer fully in 1986. It was sold to Northeast Press, now a division of Johnston Press in 1992. Editorial remained in Morpeth until the late 2010s when it moved to Alnwick and then to Sunderland. During Northeast Press ownership the Herald was printed in Hartlepool or Sunderland and since the closure of Northeast Press's remaining Sunderland print centre in September 2012 until 2014, under contract by Trinity Mirror plc on their presses in Newcastle upon Tyne. Advertising is shared with its sister title the Northumberland Gazette. The title converted to tabloid in 2013 and was redesigned to more closely resemble the Gazette in 2014. The publisher has been listed as JPIMedia Publishing North East since 2021.

== Current day ==
The Herald typically covers local news, sport and leisure pieces, also printing opinion pieces, reader letters, classified advertisements, and contains a property and real estate pull-out section.

The newspaper is published from JPIMedia Publishing North East Ltd's editorial centre in Sunderland, and is printed by Associated Printing at Dinnington, South Yorkshire. The editor is Amanda Bourn, who is also the editor of its sister titles the Northumberland Gazette, Berwick Advertiser, News Post Leader and News Guardian.

== Sources ==
- Northeast Press - Category Products - Morpeth Herald
- Northern Region Newsplan
