= South Manchester Reporter =

- Type: Weekly newspaper
- Format: Tabloid
- Owner: Manchester Evening News
- Founded: 1978
- Headquarters: Didsbury, Manchester
- Circulation: 52,603 (Jul–Dec 2006) (Weekly)
- Website: southmanchesterreporter.co.uk

The South Manchester Reporter was an English weekly newspaper published each Thursday. Distributed in South Manchester, it sold around 6,000–6,200 copies per week and was read by an estimated 57,000 people, making it one of the most widely read subsidiaries of the Manchester Evening News. The paper eventually merged with another of South Manchester's newspapers, the local version of the Manchester Metro News.

It began life on 10 November 1978 as the Withington Reporter, but the name was changed to The Reporter in March 1980, and again to the South Manchester Reporter in November 1988.

The South Manchester Reporter covered the following areas:

- Burnage
- Chorlton
- Didsbury
- Fallowfield
- Ladybarn
- Levenshulme
- Northenden
- Old Moat
- Withington
- Whalley Range
