= HMS Tribune (1918) =

Royal Navy S class destroyer

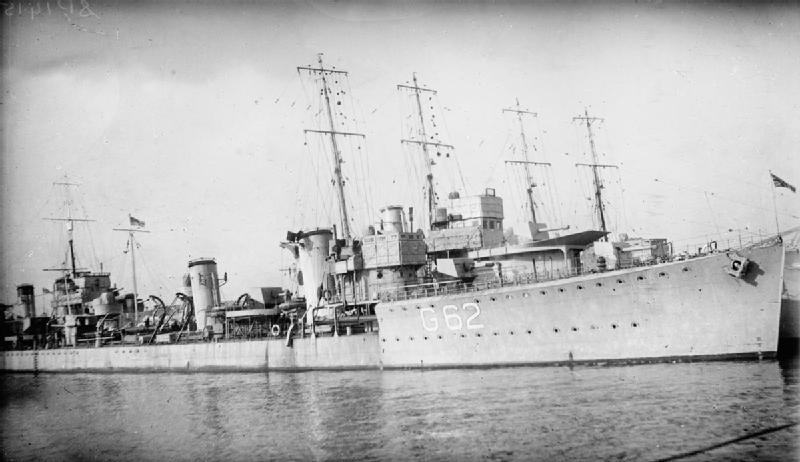
- Sister ship Tara in 1918

History

United Kingdom
- Name: Tribune
- Namesake: Tribune
- Ordered: 7 April 1917
- Builder: J. Samuel White, East Cowes
- Yard number: 1506
- Laid down: 21 August 1917
- Launched: 28 March 1918
- Completed: 16 July 1918
- Out of service: 17 December 1931
- Fate: Sold to be broken up

General characteristics
- Class & type: S-class destroyer
- Displacement: 1,075 long tons (1,092 t) normal; 1,220 long tons (1,240 t) deep load
- Length: 265 ft (81 m) p.p.
- Beam: 26 ft 8 in (8.13 m)
- Draught: 9 ft 10 in (3.00 m) mean
- Propulsion: 3 White-Forster boilers; 2 geared Brown-Curtis steam turbines, 27,000 shaft horsepower (20,000 kW)
- Speed: 36 knots (41 mph; 67 km/h)
- Range: 2,750 nmi (5,090 km) at 15 kn (28 km/h)
- Complement: 90
- Armament: 3 × single QF 4 in (102 mm) Mark IV guns; 1 × single 2-pdr 40 mm (1.6 in) Mk. II AA gun; 2 × twin 21 in (533 mm) torpedo tubes (2×2)

HMS Tribune was an S-class destroyer that served with the Royal Navy during the Russian Civil War. Launched in 1918, the vessel entered service with the Aegean Squadron of the Mediterranean Fleet. Tribune saw no action during the First World War but was involved in supporting the evacuation of refugees from the Russian Civil War, particularly from Crimea in 1920 and 1921. The ship also visited Constantinople in 1920 and 1922 during the Turkish War of Independence. In 1923, the destroyer was transferred to the Atlantic Fleet. In 1929, the ship took part in simulated amphibious warfare with the Territorial Army. In 1930, the signing of the London Naval Treaty required the Royal Navy to retire older destroyers before acquiring new ones. Tribune was one of those chosen for retirement and, in 1931, the destroyer was sold to be broken up.

== Design and development ==
Tribune was one of thirty-three S class destroyers ordered by the British Admiralty on 7 April 1917 as part of the Twelfth War Construction Programme. The design was a development of the R class introduced as a cheaper and faster alternative to the V and W class. Differences with the R class were minor, such as having the searchlight moved aft.

Tribune had an overall length of 276 ft (84 m) and a length of 265 ft (81 m) between perpendiculars. Beam was 26 ft 8 in (8.13 m) and draught 9 ft 10 in (3.00 m). Displacement was 1,075 long tons (1,092 t) normal and 1,220 long tons (1,240 t) deep load. Three White-Forster boilers fed steam to two sets of Brown-Curtis geared steam turbines rated at 27,000 shaft horsepower (20,000 kW) and driving two shafts, giving a design speed of 36 knots (67 km/h; 41 mph) at normal loading and 32.5 knots (60.2 km/h; 37.4 mph) at deep load. Two funnels were fitted. The ship carried 301 long tons (306 t) of fuel oil, which gave a design range of 2,750 nautical miles (5,090 km; 3,160 mi) at 15 knots (28 km/h; 17 mph).

Armament consisted of three QF 4-inch (102 mm) Mk IV guns on the ship's centreline. One was mounted raised on the forecastle, one on a platform between the funnels and one aft. The ship also mounted a single 2-pounder 40-millimetre (1.6 in) "pom-pom" anti-aircraft gun for air defence. Four 21-inch (533 mm) tubes were fitted in two twin rotating mounts aft. The ship was designed to mount two 18-inch (457 mm) torpedo tubes on either side of the superstructure to be controlled by the officer in charge directly, but this required the forecastle plating to be cut away. This made the vessel very wet, so they were removed. The weight saved enabled the heavier Mark V 21-inch torpedo to be carried. Four depth charge chutes were fitted aft. The ship had a complement of 90 officers and ratings.

== Construction and career ==
Ordered on 7 April 1917, Tribune was laid down by J. Samuel White at East Cowes on the Isle of Wight with the yard number 1506 on 21 August, and launched on 28 March the following year. The ship was completed on 16 July. The vessel was the fifth to carry the name, which recalled the tribunes of ancient Rome. On commissioning, Tribune joined the Aegean Squadron of the Mediterranean Fleet.

With the First World War closing, the destroyer saw no action before the Armistice, and remained in the Mediterranean Sea as part of the Sixth Destroyer Flotilla. By this time, the increasingly belligerent Russian Civil War led the Royal Navy to send ships into the Black Sea to support the White Russian forces and manage the refugee crisis that arose from the conflict, including the evacuation of the Crimea. Tribune was sent to Karkinit Bay in the Crimea in January 1920. At the same time, the war between Greece and Turkey was escalating and the Turkish War of Independence had broken out. On 27 March, the destroyer accompanied the seaplane carrier Ark Royal and the battleship Royal Oak on a visit to Constantinople. The Allies had taken over the running of the city, and much of the force supporting the White Russians was now diverted to this new threat.

On 8 December 1921, Tribune was dispatched to Mykolaiv in one of the last naval operations in the Russian conflict. Although there is a lack of contemporary evidence for how Tribune was involved in the actual evacuation, the operation was considered a success by contemporaries. On 1 December the following year, the destroyer was again stationed in Constantinople. The recent Chanak Crisis had shaken the British ruling class and, along with the Carlton Club meeting, led to the fall of the government of David Lloyd George. The destroyer was sent to Chanak on 2 December, but saw no action and returned to Malta the following day.

January 1923 found Tribune still in the Mediterranean. Soon afterwards, the destroyer returned to the UK and was decommissioned. On 21 September, Tribune was recommissioned and subsequently joined the Seventh Destroyer Flotilla of the Atlantic Fleet. The ship then served for a further eight years based at Portsmouth. On 8 August 1929, Tribune took part in a war game around Telscombe, which involved simulated amphibious warfare, combining units from the Royal Navy and the London Regiment of the Territorial Army. On 26 June 1930, the destroyer transported attendees to the Imperial Press Conference to see a demonstration of naval power. The destroyer launched a torpedo at the target ship Ross and was attacked by the submarine L25. The torpedoes ran under their targets, leaving them unharmed but simulated hits. On 7 October, the ship carried some of the coffins of the victims of the R101 disaster back to Britain from France.

On 22 April 1930, the United Kingdom signed the London Naval Treaty, which limited the total destroyer tonnage that the navy could operate. The S class was deemed out of date and ripe to be replaced with more modern ships, including the C and D-class destroyers. In July 1931, Tribune was replaced as emergency destroyer at Portsmouth, with Tribune's crew transferring to sister ship Sabre. On 17 December, the destroyer was sold to Cashmore of Newport, Wales, and broken up.

== Pennant numbers ==
Penant numbers
Pennant number	Date
F9A	November 1918
F33	January 1919
D16	January 1922
