= Norman Kennedy (rugby union) =

Scotland international rugby union player

- Born: Norman Kennedy; 17 March 1881 Old Kilpatrick, Scotland
- Died: 1 April 1960 (aged 79) Ayr, Scotland
- Notable relative(s): James Pagan, grandfather

Rugby union career
- Position: Lock
Amateur team(s)
Years	Team	Apps	(Points)
- Oxford University
- West of Scotland
Provincial / State sides
Years	Team	Apps	(Points)
- Glasgow District
- Cities District
International career
Years	Team	Apps	(Points)
1903	Scotland	3	(0)

Norman Kennedy (17 March 1881 - 15 January 1960) was a Scotland international rugby union player

== Rugby Union career ==
=== Amateur career ===
He went to school at Rugby.

He went to University College, Oxford. He played rugby union for Oxford University.

Kennedy played for West of Scotland.

=== Provincial career ===
He was capped by Glasgow District in 1902 playing in the match against Canada.

He played for Cities District against Provinces District on 24 January 1903.

=== International career ===
He was capped 3 times for the Scotland international side, all in 1903.

== Military career ==
He joined the Ayrshire Yeomanry in 1899. In the First World War he served with them in Gallipoli, Egypt and Palestine.

He commanded the Yeomanry from 1924 to 1928 as Lieutenant Colonel. Twice mentioned in despatches he was awarded the D.S.O.

He obtained the rank of Honorary Colonel.

== Business career ==
Kennedy succeeded his father as a director of Robert Young Pickering co. in Wishaw. He remained a director until the Lithgow group was founded.

He was a governing director of James Kennedy and Co. Ltd., a timber importers of Glasgow. They had extensive interests in the United States and Canada. The Head Office was 69 Buchanan Street in Glasgow, but they had branch offices in Bo'ness, Liverpool, London, and in Memphis, Tennessee.

Through his timber importing connections, he was appointed as consul for Honduras in Glasgow.

He became a director of the Glasgow Chamber of Commerce in 1920 and in 1935 he was elected the President of the chamber.

For a time, he was a director of George Outram and Co., the owners of the Glasgow Herald newspaper. He retired for health reasons in 1958.

He became a director of the Bank of Scotland.

== Farming career ==
His father James Kennedy took on a herd of Aberdeen Angus cattle at Doonholm. Both James and then Norman successfully exhibited their cattle in Scotland and in England. Norman became President of the Aberdeen Angus Cattle Society. He became chairman of the Agricultural Executive Committee for South Ayrshire; and for his work on that committee he was awarded a C.B.E. He was also made Deputy lieutenant of Ayrshire.

== Family ==
Born in Old Kilpatrick, he was the only surviving son of James Kennedy of Doonholm.

James Kennedy was one of the original directors of R.Y. Pickering when that company was founded in 1888.

James Kennedy's mother was Eliza Pagan, daughter of James Pagan (1812-1870). James Pagan was editor of the Glasgow Herald from 1856 to 1870.

James Kennedy and Eliza Pagan had 4 daughters Alice, Gertrude, Nora and Myra; as well as sons Norman and William. Unfortunately William did not survive infancy.

Norman was to marry Sylvia Bingham in 1915. Sylvia was the younger daughter of Brigadier General Edmund George Henry Bingham (Royal Artillery) and Beatrice Helen Stephen (1861-1949) who married in 1886 in Australia. Her mother Beatrice Helen had remarried when Bingham died in 1904, she married Hugh Palliser Hickman (1856-1930) in 1905.

Norman Kennedy and Sylvia Bingham had two sons and two daughters.
