= James Pagan =

Scottish reporter and managing editor for the Glasgow Herald

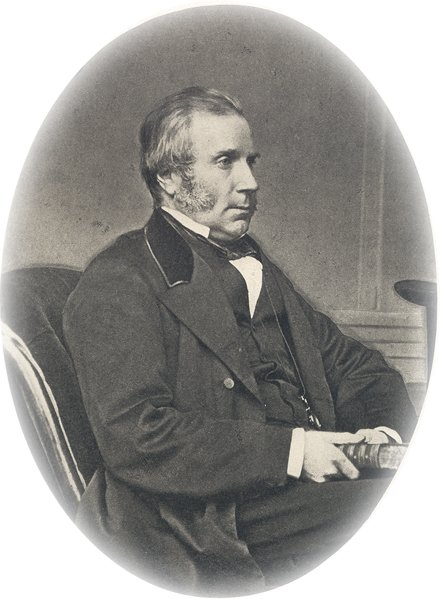
- Born: 10 October 1811; Trailflat, Scotland
- Died: 11 February 1870 (aged 58); Glasgow, Scotland
- Occupation: Newspaper editor
- Spouse: Ann McNight-Kerr
- Children: 3 sons, 2 daughters
- Parent(s): James Pagan; Elizabeth Blackstock
- Relatives: Norman Kennedy, grandson

James Pagan (18 October 1811 – 11 February 1870) was a Scottish reporter and managing editor for the Glasgow Herald and a noted antiquarian. He is credited with transitioning the Herald from a tri-weekly publication to one of the first daily newspapers in Scotland as well as greatly improving the standard of reporting in that country.

== Biography ==
=== Early life ===
James Pagan was born on 18 October 1811 in Trailflat, in the parish of Tinwald, near Dumfries. His father, also named James Pagan, was a bleacher. His mother was Elizabeth Blackstock. He was a relative of the poet Allan Cunningham, and kept up a frequent correspondence with his son, Peter.At a young age, his family moved to the town of Dumfries and he attended Dumfries Academy, where he learned a degree of Latin.

=== Career in journalism ===
After completing his education, Pagan was apprenticed as a compositor to The Dumfries and Galloway Courier, under John McDiarmid. He later became a local reporter for that newspaper and was noted as having a particularly engaging writing style. Having attended the funeral of Jean Armour, widow of Robert Burns and a close friend of Pagan's future wife, he produced for the Courier "an admirably graphic account" of the exhumation of Burn's body and how he had, as part of a phrenology examination, momentarily held the skull of the poet in his hands.Pagan eventually left his role at the Courier to become a partner in a printing firm in London, but this venture was ultimately unsuccessful.

In 1839, he returned to Scotland and joined the staff of The Glasgow Herald. One of his first reports for the Herald was an account of the Eglinton Tournament of 1839. Later biographers point to this piece as proof that Pagan "was the first in Scotland who really understood that the public wanted something more and better than the bald and brief notices which then appeared of public events" and become "a stimulus in Scottish journalism." Pagan also provided unusually engaging accounts of local government and the proceedings of the General Assembly of the Church of Scotland. During his time at the Herald, he also edited a smaller newspaper, entitled The Prospective Observer.

Not long after he began writing for the Herald, his talents as a descriptive writer were recognised by the London press and he was offered a position as a reporter for The Times. Although he refused the position, he became a correspondent for the paper from 1857 until his death in 1870.

In the early 1850s, the health of the Herald's editor, George Outram, began to deteriorate. Pagan was promoted to sub-editor and took over the editorial responsibilities of the newspaper until Outram's death in 1856. During his time as sub-editor, Pagan was credited with improving the newspaper's layout and with developing a "bolder" editorial tone, including the introduction of leading articles. In 1859, in response to the abolition of the Stamp Act, he converted the newspaper from a tri-weekly to a daily publication, setting the price at one penny and making it one of the first daily provincial newspapers in Britain. He also greatly expanded the coverage of local news, offered readers a greater selection of verbatim reporting of political and religious speeches and increased the range of telegraphic news.

=== Marriage and children ===
In 1841, Pagan married Ann Mcnight-Kerr, a relative of Pagan's former employer, John McDiarmid, and a native of Dumfries. The couple had five children, three sons (two of whom died in infancy) and two daughters.

Private verses on the wedding of James Pagan and Ann Mcnight-Kerr, by Alexander Rodger, Glasgow Poet

He lilts a good sang owre a tankard o' ale;

He cracks a sly joke too, wi' humorous glee,
But nane lashes vice so severely as he.
And ilk body likes him whaurever he gangs,
Sae fond o' his stories, his jokes, and his sangs;
But the thing he's maist prized for by every degree,

Is the generous heart ever open and free.

=== Antiquarianism ===
In addition to his work on the Herald, Pagan was an avid student of Glaswegian history, and published a number of books on the topic. The material for his first two works, "Sketches of the History of Glasgow" and "Glasgow Past and Present", originated from his activities as a reporter as well as an extensive correspondence network of local antiquarians, including Thomas Reid ('Senex') and Dr Mathie Hamilton ('Alquis').

=== Politics ===
Pagan's politics were rarely discussed by his biographers, but one author points to the Herald's harsh stance on the Indian Rebellion of 1857 and its long-time support of the Confederacy in the US Civil War to suggest that he was conservative in his views.

=== Personality and physical description ===
Pagan was a man of notable personality, descriptions of which figure prominently in his biographies. According to one friend, he "heartily loved the old melodies, with which he had a most extensive acquaintance, and could render them with fine effect in a clear, sweet voice. [...] In capping a story he was inimitable. It hardly mattered what was the subject, there was sure to come ready at hand from his humorous wallet something so funny and so pat that the table was instantly in a roar." At work, he was considered hard-working and quick-witted, unlikely to fall victim to a "sham".

Physically, he was considered a "little man, scrupulously dressed, somewhat in the old fashion, scrupulously clean, with a fair, reddish face, light grey and scanty hair, mutton-chop whiskers, and the brightest of steel blue eyes, round and full. He was always cleanly shaved, and if a speck could be seen on his glancing shirt, be sure it was a speck of taddy from his snuff-box. He wore his old large watch in his fob, attached to a black silk ribbon, at which depended a large gold seal".

Several biographers made particular note of Pagan's snuff-box, which was considered "indispensable". According to one, "It was generally poised in his hand when he gave judgment, and its contents always used when he wished to give energy to his words. It served also as a sort of memorandum box, for amid the 'best brown taddy,' there were sure to be numerous little slips of paper with short-hand hieroglyphics upon them reminding him as he opened the box on arriving in the morning – the first thing he did – of some little business to be attended to, or of some good-humoured wigging to give to a subordinate."

=== Death and legacy ===
Pagan died in Glasgow on 11 February 1870. He is remembered for having been the driving force behind the improvement of Scottish news reporting in the nineteenth century, being one of the first in Scotland to make regular use of shorthand in producing verbatim reports of local speeches.

== Published works ==
- Sketches of the History of Glasgow (1847)
- History of the Cathedral and See of Glasgow (1851)
- Glasgow Past and Present; Illustrated in Dean of Guild Reports (2 vols., 1851)
- Old Glasgow and its Environs (1864)
- Relics of Ancient Architecture and other Picturesque Scenes in Glasgow (1885)

== Bibliography ==
- Cowan, R. M. W. The Newspaper in Scotland: A Study of Its First Expansion 1815–1860. Glasgow: George Outram & Co. Ltd., 1946. Print.
- Fraser, W. Hamish "Pagan, James (1811–1870)". The Dictionary of Nineteenth Century Journalism 2011.
- Maclehose, James. Memoirs and Portraits of One Hundred Glasgow Men Who Have Died during the Last Thirty Years and in Their Lives Did Much to Make the City What It Now Is. Glasgow: James Maclehose & Sons, 1886.
- Stronach, George, and H. C. G. Matthew (rev). 'Pagan, James (1811–1870)'. Oxford Dictionary of National Biography 2004.

== See also ==
- Dumfries Courier
- Glasgow Herald
