= Scottish Standard =

Scottish newspaper

The Scottish Standard was a weekly Scottish newspaper, supportive of Scottish independence. It was launched on 9 March 2005 with a 48-page issue in full-colour that was on sale for 70p. Seven issues were published in all.

The intention of the paper was to provide a middle-market tabloid for the section of the Scottish public that support independence. Alex Salmond, leader of the Scottish National Party, wrote a column for the paper, as did other Scottish political figures supportive of independence, including Colin Fox of the Scottish Socialist Party.

It was published in Paisley. It was edited by Alex MacLeod and financed by the Belfast-based Flagship Media Group.

The paper had a modest circulation of between 6,000 and 12,000 copies, which was too low to sustain the journalists, sales and administration staff who at launch totalled approximately 38.

The failure of the title may have been due to its lack of any real promotion; the only notable attempt was a ten-second advert on Scottish Television and Grampian Television the night before the paper launched. Equally, if not more so, it suffered from distribution problems, with RS McColl being one of the few larger chains to carry it.

== See also ==
- List of newspapers in Scotland
- The National, a daily pro-independence newspaper launched in 2014.
