= HMS Sabre (H18) =

Destroyer of the Royal Navy

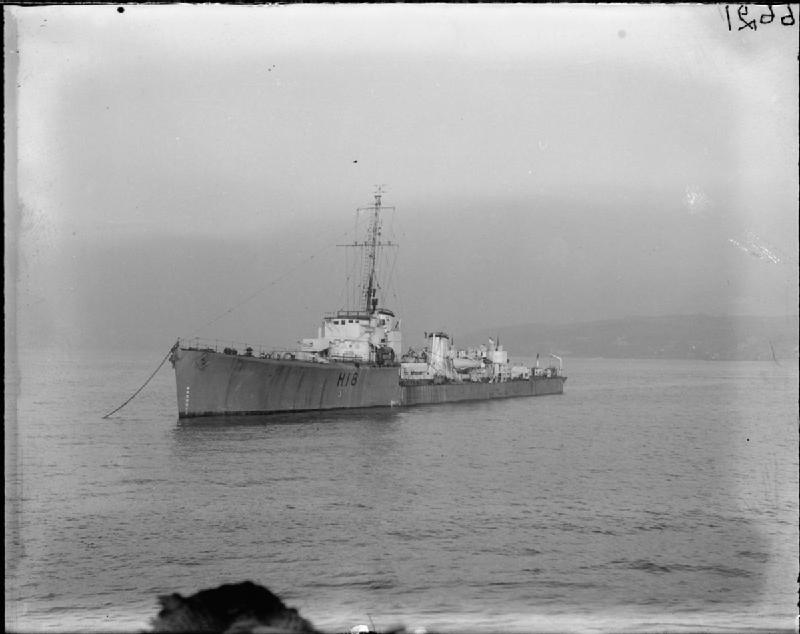

History

United Kingdom
- Name: HMS Sabre
- Ordered: April 1917
- Builder: Alex Stephens at Govan, Glasgow
- Laid down: 10 September 1917
- Launched: 23 September 1918
- Commissioned: 1919
- Identification: Pennant number: H18
- Honours and awards: Dunkirk 1940, Atlantic 1940-43
- Fate: Scrapped 1946

General characteristics
- Class & type: S-class destroyer
- Displacement: 1,075 tons
- Length: 276 ft (84 m) o/a
- Beam: 26 ft 9 in (8.15 m)
- Draught: 10 ft 10 in (3.30 m)
- Propulsion: Brown-Curtis, steam turbines, 2 shafts, 27,000 shp
- Speed: 36 knots
- Range: 250-300 tons of oil
- Complement: 90
- Armament: 3 × QF 4-inch (101.6 mm) Mark IV guns, mount P Mk. IX; 1 × QF 2 pdr Mark II "pom-pom"; 4 × Lewis Guns; 2 × twin tubes for 21 in torpedoes; 2 × fixed 14 in tubes for torpedoes (later removed)

HMS Sabre was an Admiralty S-class destroyer of the Royal Navy launched in September 1918 at the close of World War I. She was built in Scotland by Alex Stephens and completed by Fairfield Shipbuilding and Engineering Company in Govan. Commissioned for Fleet service in 1919, she was the first Royal Navy ship to carry this name.

After the war new destroyer designs were introduced, and many S-class destroyers were scrapped. By the late 1930s Sabre had been de-militarised for use as a target ship. With the outbreak of World War II, she was returned to service in 1939 despite her age and unsuitability for deployment in the Atlantic Ocean.

== Ship Modifications ==
In late 1940, Sabre was modified as a convoy escort. Equipped with 14-charge pattern depth-charge arrangements, both the after 4-inch guns and the torpedo tubes were landed, one 12-pounder (AA) and eight .5-inch (AA) (2×4) were added. Radar type 286 and later 291, was added. Later in the war four single 20 mm (AA) mountings eventually supplanted the .5-inch mountings AA.

== Service ==
In July 1931, Sabre recommissioned to replace Tribune as emergency destroyer at Portsmouth, with Tribune's crew transferring to Sabre.

=== Second World War ===
At the outbreak of the war Sabre was part of the Home Fleet based at Scapa Flow, as a TB Target and PV ranging vessel. In 1939 she was deployed for convoy defence in the Western Approaches. On 13 October 1939 while at Rosyth, Sabre was severely damaged when rammed by the armed merchant cruiser HMS Jervis Bay and was under repair until 6 May 1940.

==== Operation Dynamo (27 May – 4 June 1940) ====
As part of the 22nd Destroyer Flotilla, Sabre was conspicuous in the evacuation of British and French soldiers from the beaches at Malo-les-Bains and the harbour mole during the Dunkirk evacuation. During nine days and nights of the evacuation, despite being damaged in an air attack, Sabre made ten round trips to Dunkirk. An example of her activity at this time:

In the early hours of 28 May, three ships' boats from HMS Sabre picked up 100 men in two hours, from the beaches at Malo-Les-Bains to the east of the harbour mole. Then it was full speed to Dover with a turnaround of only 58 minutes, and the ship was back again at the Dunkirk harbour mole at 11:00 a.m., where they loaded a further 800 men. Departing at 12:30 p.m., by now the ships weight had increased considerably, lowering her propeller draft. This meant because of the falling tide and a defective echo sounder she had to slowly edge her passage through the shallows. She arrived back in Dover at 6:20 p.m. Refuelled, she was back to the Dunkirk mole at 10:30p.m., the third trip of the day. This time, the ship stayed for only 35 minutes picking up another 500 troops.

Finally on 4 June just after 2:00 p.m., the Admiralty announced the end of Operation Dynamo. All together an armada of over 860 ships, including 39 destroyers, had taken part in the evacuation of troops from the beaches and harbour. The Admiralty calculated the total British and Allied troops landed in England amounted to 338,226 troops rescued.

Sabre had made more round trips than most and brought back to Dover a total of 5,765 soldiers – amongst the highest number for any individual ship. The captain, Commander Brian Dean R.N. was awarded the D.S.O. One ship’s officer received a D.S.C. and four ratings the D.S.M., with six further Mentioned in Dispatches.

==== Operation Aerial (15 – 25 June 1940) ====
After Dunkirk there were still Allied forces to be evacuated from other French ports along the coast westward so the navy had further work to do. ‘Operation Cycle' launched on 10 June rescued some 11,000 from the English Channel port of Le Havre. Then on 12 June Sabre was deployed to help with the evacuation of still more British and Allied forces in ‘Operation Aerial’ from the rest of France. It began with the evacuation of Cherbourg and continued for the next ten days, moving south to St Nazaire, Bordeaux and right down to the Franco-Spanish border. Sabre was sent to Alderney, the northerly island amongst the Channel Islands, on 23 June and helped evacuate around 1,400 islanders to safety in Weymouth. The final Allied evacuation of France ended on 25 June. By that time a further 215,000 servicemen and civilians had been saved, however although successful, Operations 'Aerial' and 'Cycle' never captured the public's imagination like ‘Operation Dynamo’.

==== Rescue of children from SS Volendam (30 August – 1 September 1940) ====
In September 1940 Sabre was detailed to meet the first slow Atlantic convoy, as it approached the United Kingdom from Canada. A Finnish merchant ship, Elle, 3,868 tons was torpedoed at 4:25 a.m. on 28 August and Sabre joined the hunt for the German U-boat U-101 without success. Then two days later, during the evening of 30 August off Malin Head, Sabre helped rescue the survivors of a torpedoed Dutch ship, the 15,434 ton Holland America line, SS Volendam. She was in an outward bound convoy OB 205 for Canada, carrying 879 passengers and 273 crew members. This included 320 children with their escorts under the Children's Overseas Reception Board scheme some as young as five, together with 286 other passengers. They were taken to various west coast ports in Scotland. (Volendam did not sink and was eventually taken in tow by the rescue tug HMS Salvonia and beached on the Isle of Bute. Repaired in 1941 she returned to war service).

Tory Island incident December 1940
In December Sabre, whilst escorting an inbound convoy SC 13 into Liverpool, was involved in a rescue attempt. Recently she had been badly damaged in an attempt to rescue the crew of the Dutch ship, SS Stolwijk, which had run ashore on Tory Island on the northwestern coast of Ireland in a full gale. The Sabre went in so close that she was almost among the breakers; and one great wave swept her decks, flattening the bridge and taking with it all the upper-deck fittings. The captain was badly injured, but his was the worst injury, and no one was lost. Sabre put into Derry, Northern Ireland on 7 December and sailed to Larne, Northern Ireland, for repairs on 18 January 1941 Commander Brian Dean was invalided ashore and replaced by Lieutenant Peter Gretton.

Further convoy rescue off St Kilda 1941
At 7:54 p.m. on 31 December 1941, the British Motor Tanker Cardita, 8,237 tons (Anglo-Saxon Petroleum Co Ltd), a straggler from convoy HX 166, en route Curaçao to Shellhaven (Thames Estuary), was torpedoed by U-87 110 mi (180 km) from St Kilda. The vessel foundered on 3 January 1942. Out of the ship's crew, 27 were lost, 23 were picked up by HMS Onslow and a further 10 crew members by Sabre and landed at Reykjavík, Iceland.

In March 1942 after a successful ‘Warship Week’ National Savings campaign Sabre was adopted by the civil community of Bebington, Cheshire, the same month she was detached for escort of the Russian Convoy PQ 13 during its initial stage of passage to Iceland in the Northwest Approaches. For most of the war Sabre was attached to 1st Escort Group based at Liverpool and then 21st Escort Group for convoy defence in NW Approaches. In 1943 she was deployed for Atlantic convoy defence, in 1944 Atlantic convoy defence and support based in Iceland. In 1945 Sabre deployed for coastal convoy defence in UK waters. At the end of the Second World War Sabre was placed on the disposal list and sold to be broken up for scrap in November 1945, arriving at the breaker’s yard at Grangemouth on the Firth of Forth in 1946.

== Bibliography ==
- Colledge, J. J.; Warlow, Ben (2006) [1969]. Ships of the Royal Navy: The Complete Record of All Fighting Ships of the Royal Navy from the 15th Century to the Present (3rd Rev ed.). London: Chatham Publishing. ISBN 978-1-86176-281-8. OCLC 67375475.
- Friedman, Norman (2009). British Destroyers: From Earliest Days to the Second World War. Barnsley, UK: Seaforth Publishing. ISBN 978-1-84832-049-9.
- Gardiner, Robert & Gray, Randal, eds. (1985). Conway's All The World's Fighting Ships 1906–1921. London: Conway Maritime Press. ISBN 0-85177-245-5.
- March, Edgar J. (1966). British Destroyers: A History of Development, 1892–1953; Drawn by Admiralty Permission From Official Records & Returns, Ships' Covers & Building Plans. London: Seeley Service. OCLC 164893555.
- The Miracle of Dunkirk, (1998), Walter Lord, Wordsworth military Library, ISBN 1-85326-685-X
- The Sands of Dunkirk, (1974), Richard Collier, Fontana
- Convoy Escort Commander, (1964), Sir Peter Gretton (memoirs), Cassell & Co., London
- Convoys to Russia: (1992) Allied Convoys and Naval Surface Operations in Arctic Waters, 1941–45, Bob Ruegg & Arnold Hague, World Ship Society
- Arctic Convoys, (1994), R Woodman, John Murray
- The Gourock Times of 6 September 1940: Newspaper article about the torpedoing of SS Volendam
- Private Papers of Commander Brian Dean DSO RN,(1895-1975), Imperial War Museum, Catalogue number: Documents 7792
- Convoy Escort Commander, Sir Peter Gretton, Corgi, London, 1971
- Dunkirk, A.D. Divine, D.S.M. Faber & Faber, London 2018
