= The National (Scotland) =

Daily Scottish newspaper

Coordinates: 55.866045°N 4.254473°W

- First edition of The National, 24 November 2014
- Type: Daily newspaper
- Format: Compact / tabloid
- Owner: USA Today Co.
- Publisher: Newsquest
- Editor: Laura Webster
- Founded: 2014; 12 years ago
- Political alignment: Scottish independence
- Language: English; Scottish Gaelic; Scots
- Headquarters: 200 Renfield Street; Glasgow; G2 3QB; UK
- Country: United Kingdom (Scotland)
- Circulation: 2,568 (as of 2024)
- Sister newspapers: Glasgow Times; The Herald
- ISSN: 2057-231X
- Website: www.thenational.scot

The National is a Scottish daily newspaper owned by Newsquest. It began publication on 24 November 2014, and was the first and only daily newspaper in Scotland to support Scottish independence. Launched as a response to calls from Newsquest's readership for a pro-independence paper in the wake of the 2014 Scottish independence referendum, it is a sister paper of The Herald, and as of 2025 was edited by Laura Webster. Initially published on weekdays, a Saturday edition was added in May 2015. The National is printed in tabloid format, and is also available via online subscription.

Details of its launch were announced on 21 November, with further information given at a Scottish National Party (SNP) rally the following day. Upon its launch, The National stated that it is a separate entity from the Scottish National Party. It was launched on a five-day trial basis against the backdrop of a general decline in newspaper sales, with an initial print-run of 60,000 copies for its first edition, but this was increased the following day as a result of public demand, and Newsquest decided to print it on a permanent basis after healthy sales continued throughout the first week. The first front page carried a story about charities urging devolution of powers over welfare legislation to Scotland.

Reception to the newspaper's launch was mixed in both media and political circles. Libby Brooks of The Guardian said that its international coverage was strong and that its news was "central belt-centric – and Holyrood-filtered". Labour peer George Foulkes branded it "McPravda". The Scottish journalist and broadcaster Lesley Riddoch, who now writes for the paper, stated that its launch could be a "sound business move" by its publishers.

By January 2015, daily sales had fallen to below 20,000. The following year, its print edition dropped below 10,000, and was being outsold by every Scottish regional daily newspaper with the exception of the Paisley Daily Express. The Sunday National was launched as a Sunday edition on 9 September 2018 as a replacement to its former sister title the Sunday Herald.

== Background ==
The National describes itself as "the newspaper that supports an independent Scotland", and has a masthead depicting a map of Scotland. This had to be hastily redesigned for the second issue after it was pointed out that Shetland was missing from the map on the first edition.

Details of the newspaper were revealed on 21 November 2014 after The Guardian obtained a copy of a letter being circulated to retailers by Newsquest announcing its forthcoming publication. A sister paper of The Herald and the Sunday Herald, The National would be the first daily newspaper in Scotland to support Scottish independence, and was being piloted in response to a request from Herald readers for a pro-independence newspaper. During the 2014 independence referendum, the Sunday Herald had been the only newspaper to support the "Yes" campaign, and saw an increase in its circulation—with sales rising by 60% in the week preceding the referendum and 111% in the week afterwards. Richard Walker, editor of the Sunday Herald, was announced as the new paper's editor. On 22 November, Walker told a gathering of Scottish National Party (SNP) supporters assembled at Glasgow's SSE Hydro that The National's publishers would trial the newspaper for five days, but that it would become a permanent addition to the market if there was demand for it. Copies would cost 50p, while an online version would also be available via subscription.

The paper was launched with an initial print-run of 60,000, and was edited by a skeleton staff during the trial run, with plans to employ more journalists if it became a permanent publication. Initial contributors included Sunday Herald journalists Jamie Maxwell and Peter Geoghegan, as well as freelance reporter Sarah Cooper. During the initial week of publication, Walker spoke of his belief that The National would continue beyond the trial period, but said the decision was in the hands of its publishers. Following healthy sales in the first few days, Newsquest executives decided on 27 November to continue printing the newspaper, and to allocate it additional resources. On the same day, Neil Mackay, The National's news editor, confirmed that the paper would be published on a permanent basis. Publication then continued on weekdays until the introduction of a Saturday edition in May 2015.

On 27 November 2014, Alex Salmond, a former First Minister of Scotland, publicly endorsed The National when he took a copy of it on stage to accept The Spectator's award for Politician of the Year. On 27 January 2015, Newsquest area manager Tim Blott announced that the newspaper's website would be relaunched in February, and Callum Baird would be appointed as assistant editor. The first Saturday edition of The National was published on 9 May to provide coverage of the results of the 2015 UK general election. Walker subsequently described the response as "very strong" and said that the newspaper would continue to be printed on a Saturday for "as long as there's a public demand for it." In September 2015 Walker announced his resignation from Newsquest, and consequently the Sunday Herald and The National, but agreed to continue with The National as a consulting editor. He was succeeded as editor by Callum Baird. As Scotland prepared to welcome its first batch of refugees from the Syrian Civil War an edition of the newspaper published on 17 November 2015 carried the headline "Welcome to Scotland". The Independent reported that an image of the front page was subsequently shared multiple times among users of social media.

== Launch ==
Launched as a 32-page newspaper, and printed in tabloid format, The National was first published on Monday 24 November 2014, and according to its editor received an "amazing response" from readers, with its print-run for the following day's edition increased to 100,000. The Press Gazette reported that 80,000 copies were produced on the third day, while 12,000 online digital subscriptions had been registered at a price of £1.50 per week. Other sources, including The Guardian, and subsequently The National itself, put the online subscription figure at 11,000. On 27 November, The Guardian reported that of the 100,000 copies printed on 25 November, unofficial sales figures indicated that only 50,000 had been sold, and that daily sales were stabilising at around the 50,000 mark. Sales figures for the first Friday edition, published on 28 November, were reported as 40,000 by The Guardian, with an average daily sale for the first week of 44,000 copies. On 3 December, The Guardian reported that unofficial industry sales figures indicated 36,000 copies were sold for the Monday edition of the second week. On 27 January 2015, The Guardian reported that daily sales had fallen to below 20,000—a figure consisting of around 15,000 print sales, with a further 2,500 to 3,000 digital subscriptions. By 2017, ABC figures showed that the average daily sale of the print edition of The National was just 7,771 copies, and average readership of each digital edition was 1,975. In February 2023, ABC reported daily paid circulation of 3,210 single copies and 345 subscriptions.

On 27 November 2014, Newsquest announced plans for the Friday edition, published the following day, to be expanded to 40 pages to accommodate news coverage of the Smith Commission's report into increased devolution for Scotland, which was published on 27 November, and due to a large demand for space from advertisers. The 28 November edition also included an editorial thanking readers for backing the new publication. Speaking to The Guardian shortly after its launch, Walker said that the initial print run had been set as 30,000, but a last-minute decision was taken to double it, something he described as "in hindsight, a good decision". The National's launch and success came at a time of general decline in the print media industry, where news providers were cutting staff and resources due to a downturn in newspaper sales. Douglas Beattie of the New Statesman and Alex Massie of The Spectator reported that copies of the first edition, which sold out, were being auctioned on eBay for at least £10. The Financial Times reported that pro-independence campaigners used social media to help potential readers locate available copies of the paper when the first edition had sold out in many areas.

However, the launch was not without its problems when three major supermarkets did not stock copies. On launch day, Sainsbury's said that its tills had not been updated in time to enable them to sell the paper, but that it would begin doing so from the following day, while Tesco and Morrisons planned to monitor sales before deciding whether or not to stock it. Morrisons also said that it did not have the space to sell the newspaper without doing so at the expense of local titles. On 27 November, The Guardian reported that the distribution issues had been resolved, while STV News suggested the distribution problems were responsible for the fewer number of printed copies in the latter part of the launch week. Stewart Kirkpatrick, the former digital chief of Yes Scotland noted that The National had no digital presence at the time of its launch, something that prompted him to observe "We're in the age of 'digital first' not 'digital when we get round to it'."

The first edition of The National carried the headline "Give Scotland the powers to cut child poverty", an article in which charities urged the Smith Commission to devolve welfare powers to the Scottish Parliament. The newspaper also included a mixture of national and international stories, with Libby Brooks of The Guardian noting the international coverage was "[stronger] than one is used to from a Scottish title [with] stories from Tunisia and Gaza as well as a profile of [Iranian President] Hassan Rouhani". There was also sport and business coverage, but the BBC's Jamie McIvor wrote of the first edition that "stories related to independence, Scottish politics and issues which featured in the referendum campaign characterise the news pages". The newspaper's opening edition also set out its mission statement:

The status quo is no longer an option and there is an unquenchable desire for greater devolution. Quite simply, the Scottish people want to be more directly and deeply involved in the decisions that affect them and the generations to come. It is with this uppermost in mind that today we launch The National, a daily newspaper that will fly a vibrant flag for independence and the right for Scots to govern themselves.

== Reception ==
Details of the paper's launch announced were made at an SNP political event. The newspaper said it is politically independent of the SNP. Its inaugural editorial said that being a mouthpiece for the party "would not be a healthy course to follow. We will be critical where appropriate and complimentary when merited." In The Guardian, Libby Brooks wrote that "less charitable observers were suggesting that launching at a political party’s hoolie might not have been the most auspicious of starts" for the newspaper. Labour peer George Foulkes dubbed it "Scotland's Pravda". Damian Thompson, an associate editor with The Spectator, described the launch event as "creepy". McIvor wrote that the calibre of its stablemates together with a respected editor had ensured The National was being taken seriously in political and media circles, but that the onus was on it to prove its credibility as a publication that supports independence rather than being viewed as "a propaganda organ, a cynical business exercise or the old media equivalent of some pro-independence websites".

Writing for The Guardian, the journalist and broadcaster Lesley Riddoch took a different view, suggesting that the launch of a pro-independence newspaper in a country where 45% of voters had recently voted for independence "may be a large but calculated risk and a very sound business move", and that "Perhaps the novelty and sheer boldness of the National newspaper will match the national mood". Kirkpatrick, although critical of its online shortfalls, was positive about the paper's content, describing it as "a lively mix of briefs and longer pieces". Douglas Beattie of the New Statesman said The National "has a clear raison d'etre and will be welcomed by a large number of the 1.6 million Scots who voted Yes". Stephen Daisley of STV News wrote that it was "both frustratingly light [and] stodgily worthy", but drew favourable comparisons with the Scottish Standard, a weekly pro-independence paper launched in 2005 that ceased publication after just seven issues, suggesting The National would succeed because it had more financial backing, and as there was a latent demand for a news sheet supporting independence. Writing in The Guardian, the journalist and author Peter Preston said there were "many good things to say about the National" including its editor, who was leading a newspaper that "helps to reflect public opinion better".

In 2017 The National published an article by the pro-independence Green MSP Ross Greer in which he wrote that he believed "The National often does more harm than good to the cause of independence", after the newspaper labelled a number of Conservative politicians as "Enemies of the Scottish People" on its front page, adding that the headline "followed a pattern of front pages which are less thought-provoking and more cringe-inducing".

== Sunday National ==
In September 2018, The National launched the Sunday National as a Sunday edition to fill the void left by the closing of the Sunday Herald.

== See also ==
- The Scots Independent
- The New European
