= Dunfermline Press =

Scottish tabloid newspaper

- Type: Weekly newspaper
- Format: Tabloid
- Owner(s): Newsquest
- Founded: 1859
- Headquarters: Dunfermline, Fife, Scotland
- Circulation: 5,408 (as of 2023)
- Website: dunfermlinepress.com

The Dunfermline Press and West of Fife Advertiser (commonly known as the Dunfermline Press in Scotland and simply The Press in the Dunfermline area) is a weekly Scottish tabloid newspaper, based in Dunfermline, Fife.

== History ==
The Dunfermline Press was founded in 1859 by the Romanes family. The family owned several other local newspapers, including the Border Telegraph and Stirling News and increased their portfolio by 14 when taking over Berkshire Regional Newspapers from Trinity Mirror. In 2005 the group acquired its first company without newspapers when it bought Your Radio FM.

With average sales of 21,852 the newspaper was read by more people in the Dunfermline area than any other quality newspapers combined. When included with the other local newspapers owned and published by the Dunfermine Press Group, such as the Central Fife Times and the Fife and Kinross Extra, the Dunfermline Press Group claimed to reach over 100,000 readers in East Central Scotland.

Dunfermline Press went into receivership after the death of owner Deirdre Romanes and were acquired by management and Lloyds Bank under the name Romanes Media in 2012. Newsquest acquired Romanes Media in 2015.

Historical copies of the Dunfermline Press, dating back to 1859, are available to search and view in digitised form at the British Newspaper Archive.

== Content ==
Being a local newspaper, the Dunfermline Press focuses on local issues (such as the removal of tolls at the Forth Road Bridge and the fortunes of local sports teams, mainly Dunfermline Athletic Football Club). One page is normally devoted to letters to the editor, while readers also air their views in small "viewpoints" across several pages. Gossip with a humorous slant is provided by an anonymous contributor known as "Observer". The crossword that used to be on the back page, underneath the Sports headlines was removed in early 2010, which proved unpopular with readers.

== See also ==
- List of newspapers in Scotland
