= Dumfries Courier =

- Type: Weekly newspaper
- Owner: DNG Media
- Founder: Henry Duncan
- Founded: 1809
- Ceased publication: 1939
- Relaunched: 1977
- Language: English
- Headquarters: 6 High Street, Annan, DG12 6EJ, Scotland
- City: Annan
- Country: Scotland
- Circulation: 10,775 (as of 2023)
- Sister newspapers: Annandale Observer; Annandale Herald; Moffat News
- OCLC number: 373603342
- Website: dng24.co.uk

The Dumfries Courier is a weekly newspaper published in Annan, Scotland. It was founded in 1809 by Rev. Dr Henry Duncan (1774-1846) as The Dumfries and Galloway Courier and is currently published by the DNG Media Group as the Dumfries Courier.

== History ==
Henry Duncan, minister of Ruthwell and creator of the savings bank, founded the Courier in order to compete with the Dumfries Weekly Journal, which he described as "an organ of public opinion" with "neither weight nor authority". He obtained his financial backing from his brothers, who were shipping merchants in Liverpool. Duncan owned and edited the newspaper until 1817, when he requested that John McDiarmid take over the editorship and become a partner in the business. Both editors displayed a moderate-to-liberal political stance, demonstrated by lengthy commentaries on prison reform, suffrage, Catholic emancipation and education. After McDiarmid's death in 1852, the editorship was taken over by his son, William R. M’Diarmid.

In 1884, the Courier was purchased by local conservatives and merged with the Dumfriesshire and Galloway Herald and Register in order to form the Dumfries and Galloway Courier and Herald. In 1939, it ceased publication owing to wartime paper shortages. In 1977, the newspaper, still owned by Dumfriesshire Newspapers Limited, restarted publication under the title The Dumfries Courier, sharing its online presence with DNG Media's other regional titles.

== Operations ==
The paper initially ran bi-weekly and was distributed on Tuesdays and Thursdays at a price of six pence, but became weekly from 1821. When the paper resumed production in 1977, it did so as a free newspaper.

== Notable reporters ==
- Robert Carruthers, later of the Inverness Courier
- James Pagan, later of the Glasgow Herald.

== See also ==
- List of newspapers in Scotland
