= An Gàidheal Ùr =

Defunct Scottish Gaelic language newspaper

- Type: Monthly newspaper
- Format: Compact
- Editor: Murchadh MacLeòid
- Founded: 1998
- Ceased publication: 2009
- Headquarters: Taigh a' Mhorair Leverhulme, Ceàrnag Phearsabhail, Stornoway Lewis HS1 2DD
- Price: £20 for annual subscription

An Gàidheal Ùr was a 12-page monthly newspaper published in Scottish Gaelic. The name means New Gael in a play on an older magazine publication called An Gàidheal. People usually received the paper as a supplement in the West Highland Free Press or by subscription. It ceased publication in 2009 after funding and advertising from Bòrd na Gàidhlig ended.

== Content ==
It generally carried Scottish Gaelic or Highland related content such as stories about new developments of the language, crofting, ferry services, media stories, cultural events and sport.

It also had various opinion columns and regularly carried job advertisements of Gaelic related jobs.

Writing for the paper, Aonghas Phàdraig Caimbeul was awarded Gaelic journalist of the year at the 2007 Scottish Press Awards.

== See also ==
- List of newspapers in Scotland
