= The Daily Advertiser =

The Daily Advertiser may refer to the following newspapers:

- The Daily Advertiser (Wagga Wagga), Australia
- The Daily Advertiser (Lafayette, Louisiana), United States
- Boston Daily Advertiser, United States
- Daily Gazetteer, London, 1735–1797; also issued under other, related, names

== See also ==
- Advertiser (disambiguation)
