= George Outram =

Scottish poet

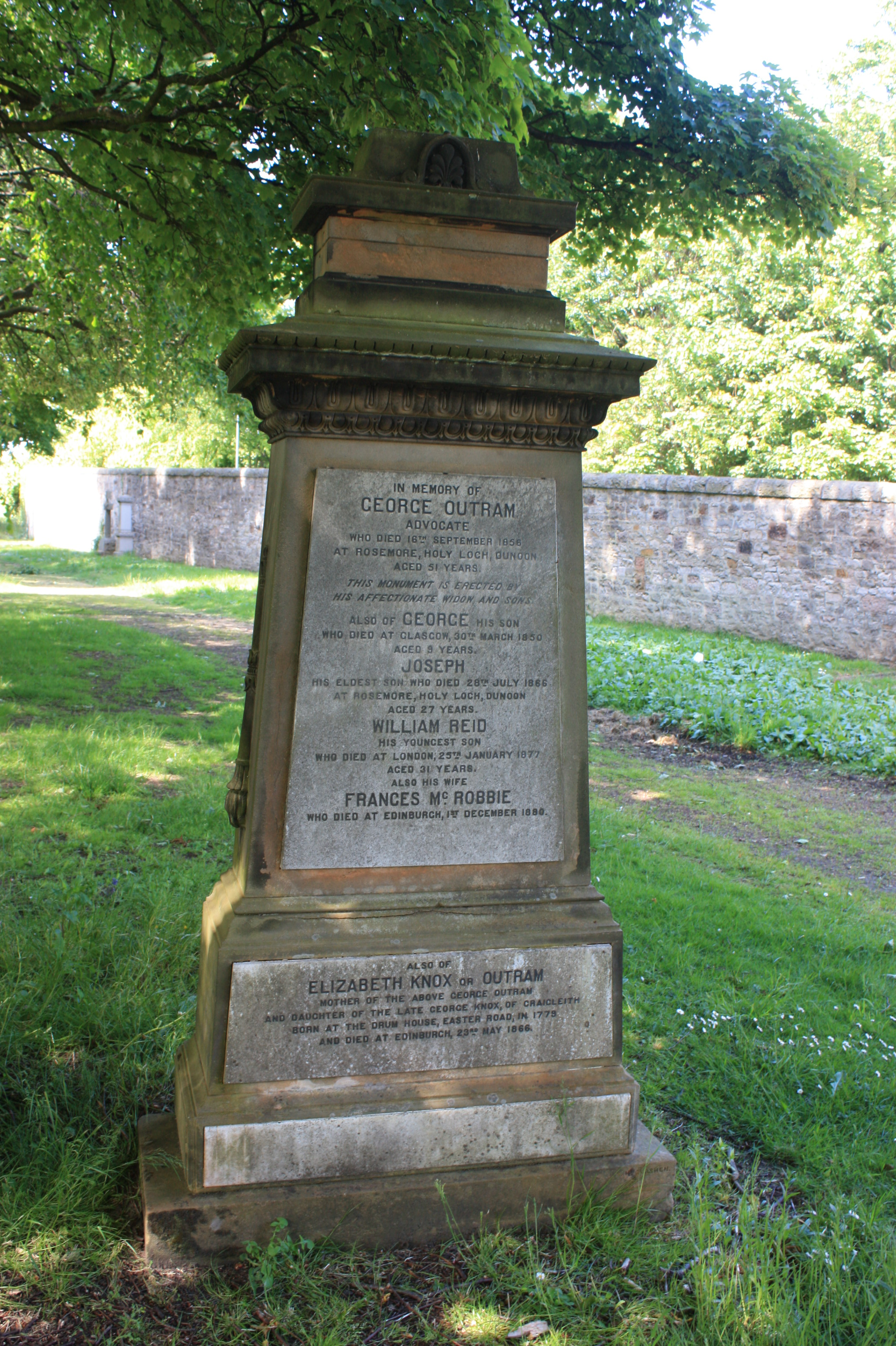
George Outram's grave, Warriston Cemetery

George Outram (25 March 1805 – 15 September 1856) was a Scottish humorous poet, Scottish advocate, friend of John Wilson, and for some time editor of The Herald in Glasgow.

== Life ==
Outram was born on 25 March 1805 the son of Elizabeth Knox (1779–1866) and Joseph Outram, manager of the Clyde Ironworks. He was born in the parish of New Monkland and Coatbridge. In 1807 the family moved to Leith, the harbour area of Edinburgh. He attended Leith High School and then the University of Edinburgh. He qualified as an advocate in 1827.

In the 1830s he is listed as living at 14 Fettes Row, on the northern fringe of Edinburgh's New Town.

In 1837 he married Frances McRobbie (d.1880) who had been born in Jamaica. In the same year he took over the parent company which printed the Glasgow Herald, founded in 1783 by John Mennons. Under Outram's leadership the company grew considerably, becoming the "eponymous" Scottish printing company and renaming itself George Outram & Co. From 19 July 1839 the newspaper bore the name of Outram & Co as its printer.

He died at his country residence of Rosemore on the Holy Loch near Dunoon on 15 September 1856.

He is buried in Warriston Cemetery in north Edinburgh. The grave lies close to the sealed east gate, behind the large monument to the poet Alexander Smith. He is buried with his wife, three sons, and mother (who died last).

== Works ==
He printed privately in 1851 Legal lyrics and metrical illustrations of the Scotch form of process, and later some of his work was collected posthumously in Lyrics, Legal and Miscellaneous, which was published with a short biography in 1874.

Media offices
Preceded by Frances Weir	Editor of The Herald; 1837–1856	Succeeded by James Pagan
