= The Gourock Times =

Scottish Newspaper

- Founder: Richard Steele
- Founded: 15 May 1915
- Ceased publication: 1980

The Gourock Times was a weekly newspaper published in the west of Scotland town of Gourock from 1915 to 1980. A complete archive of the newspaper is available at the Watt Library in Greenock.

== Wartime scoop ==
The Gourock Times of 6 September 1940 broke the story about the child evacuee ship SS Volendam being torpedoed, and the rescued children from the ship being safely brought to port on the Clyde. HMS Sabre (H18) was one of the destroyers rescuing evacuated children from SS Volendam, between 30 August – 1 September 1940. She was in an outward bound convoy OB 205 for Canada, carrying 879 passengers and 273 crew members. This included 320 children with their escorts under the Children's Overseas Reception Board scheme some as young as five, together with 286 other passengers. They were taken to various west coast ports in Scotland.
