= Advertiser (disambiguation) =

An advertiser is an entity that advertises.

Advertiser is also the name of several newspapers around the world:

- The Advertiser (Adelaide), Adelaide, South Australia, Australia (preceded by The South Australian Advertiser)
- The Advertiser (Bendigo), Bendigo, Victoria, Australia
- The Advertiser (1922–1939), successor to the Evelyn Observer
- Albany Advertiser, Western Australia (for a while called Australian Advertiser)
- Anderson Valley Advertiser, a weekly newspaper in Anderson Valley, California, United States
- The Croydon Advertiser, London, England, United Kingdom
- Edinburgh Advertiser, defunct newspaper of Edinburgh, Scotland, United Kingdom
- Geelong Advertiser, a daily newspaper of Geelong, Victoria, Australia
- Melbourne Advertiser, defunct newspaper of Melbourne, Victoria, Australia

== See also ==
- The Daily Advertiser (disambiguation)
- Daily Gazetteer, of London, England, published as the Daily Gazetteer or London Advertiser 1746–1748, the Gazetteer and London Daily Advertiser 1753–1764, and the Gazetteer and New Daily Advertiser 1764–1796
