= Tiverton Gazette =

Weekly tabloid local newspaper for the town of Tiverton, Devon

The Tiverton and Mid Devon Gazette's former newsroom on Bampton Street.

The Tiverton Gazette is a weekly tabloid local newspaper for the town of Tiverton, Devon.

Always published on Tuesdays to coincide with the market day, it first appeared as the Tiverton Gazette and East Devon Herald in 1858. Founder Robert Were was only 22 years old, and died just five years later. The newspaper split into three editions in 1872: the Tiverton Gazette, the Crediton Gazette and the South Molton Gazette. It was re-merged in the mid-1890s as the Mid Devon Gazette, but then split into Town and Rural editions before splitting three ways again.

Currently there is one reporter based in their St Andrew's Street office, working alongside a dozen reporters based in Exeter and more in Torbay and Barnstaple generating news for the newspaper and for devonlive.com.
