= The Herald (Glasgow) =

Scottish broadsheet newspaper

- Front page for 11 January 2020
- Type: Daily newspaper
- Format: Broadsheet
- Owner: USA Today Co.
- Publisher: Newsquest
- Editor: Catherine Salmond
- Founded: 1783
- Political alignment: Devolutionist
- Language: English
- Headquarters: 125 Fullarton Drive; Glasgow; G2 3QB
- City: Glasgow
- Country: Scotland
- Circulation: 9,952 (as of 2024)
- Sister newspapers: Glasgow Times; Herald on Sunday; The National
- ISSN: 0965-9439
- OCLC number: 29991088
- Website: heraldscotland.com

The Herald is a Scottish broadsheet newspaper founded in 1783. The Herald is the longest running national newspaper in the world and is the eighth oldest daily paper in the world. The title was simplified from The Glasgow Herald in 1992. Following the closure of the Sunday Herald, the Herald on Sunday was launched as a Sunday edition on 9 September 2018.

== History ==
=== Founding ===
The newspaper was founded by an Edinburgh-born printer called John Mennons in January 1783 as a weekly publication called the Glasgow Advertiser. Mennons' first edition had a global scoop: news of the treaties of Versailles reached Mennons via the Lord Provost of Glasgow just as he was putting the paper together. War had ended with the American colonies, he revealed. The Herald, therefore, is as old as the United States of America, give or take an hour or two.

The story was, however, only carried on the back page. Mennons, using the larger of two fonts available to him, put it in the space reserved for late news.

=== First sale and renaming ===
In 1802, Mennons sold the newspaper to Benjamin Mathie and James McNayr, former owner of the Glasgow Courier, which along with the Mercury, was one of two papers Mennons had come to Glasgow to challenge. Mennons' son Thomas retained an interest in the company. The new owners changed the name to The Herald and Advertiser and Commercial Chronicle in 1803. In 1805 the name changed again, this time to The Glasgow Herald when Thomas Mennons severed his ties to the paper.

=== George Outram ===
From 1836 to 1964, The Glasgow Herald was owned by George Outram & Co. becoming one of the first daily newspapers in Scotland in 1858. The company took its name from the paper's editor of 19 years, George Outram, an Edinburgh advocate best known in Glasgow for composing light verse. Outram was an early Scottish nationalist, a member of the National Association for the Vindication of Scottish Rights. The Glasgow Herald, under Outram, argued that the promised privileges of the Treaty of Union had failed to materialise and demanded that, for example, that the heir to the British throne be called "Prince Royal of Scotland". "Any man calling himself a Scotsman should enrol in the National Association," said The Herald.

=== Later years ===
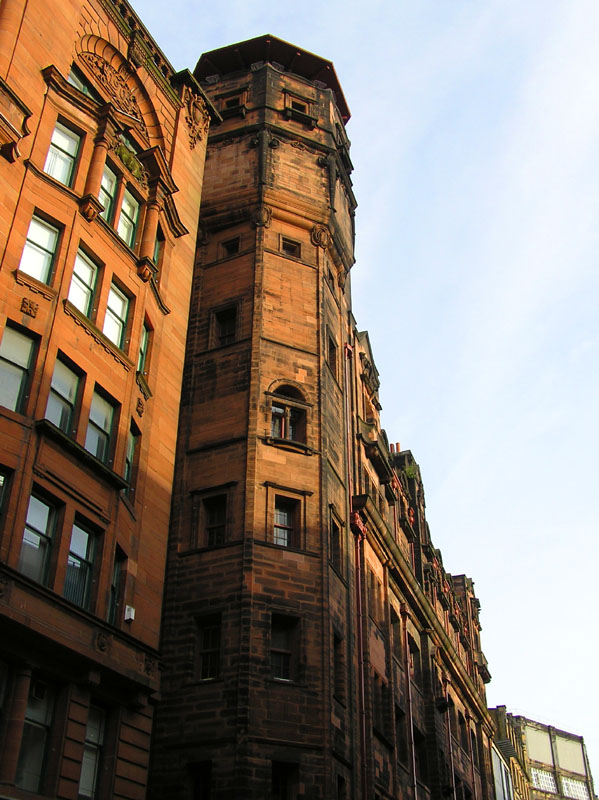
The Herald's former building in Glasgow

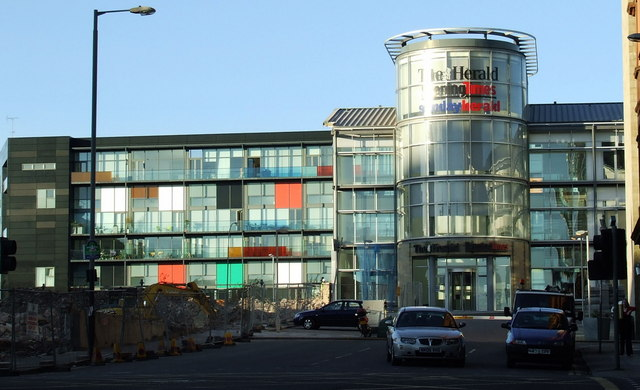
The Herald building

In 1895, the publication moved to a building in Mitchell Street designed by Charles Rennie Mackintosh, which now houses the architecture centre, The Lighthouse. In 1988, the publication moved to offices in Albion Street in Glasgow into the former Scottish Daily Express building. It is now based in a purpose-built building in Renfield Street, Glasgow.

One of the most traumatic episodes in the history of The Glasgow Herald was the battle for control and ownership of the paper in 1964. Two multi-millionaires, The 1st Baron Fraser of Allander and The 1st Baron Thomson of Fleet, whose newspaper empire included The Glasgow Herald's archrival, The Scotsman, fought for control of the title for 52 days. Lord Fraser of Allander won. The paper's then editor, James Holburn, was a "disapproving onlooker". The Labour Party condemned the battle as "big business at its worst".

The newspaper changed its name to The Herald on 3 February 1992, dropping Glasgow from its title, but not its masthead. That same year the title was bought by Caledonia Newspaper Publishing & Glasgow. In 1996, it was purchased by Scottish Television (STV; later called the Scottish Media Group). As of 2003, the newspaper along with its related publications, the Evening Times and Sunday Herald (now defunct), were owned by the Newsquest media group, part of Gannett.

== Notable people ==
=== Editorship ===
Graeme Smith assumed editorship of The Herald in January 2017, replacing Magnus Llewellin, who had held the post since 2012. Notable past editors include: John Mennons, 1782; Samuel Hunter, 1803; George Outram, 1836; James Pagan, 1856; William Jack FRSE (1870–1876); James Holburn 1955–1965; George MacDonald Fraser, 1964; Alan Jenkins, 1978; Arnold Kemp 1981 ; Mark Douglas-Home, 2000; and Charles McGhee, 2006.

=== Columnists ===
Prominent columnists include Alison Rowat, who covers everything from television to international statecraft; former Scottish justice secretary and SNP politician Kenny MacAskill; Kevin McKenna and David Pratt; and business editor Ian McConnell, both multi-award-winning journalists, provide analysis of their fields every Friday.

=== The Herald Diary ===
Currently edited by Lorne Jackson, the column has been spun off in to a popular series of books since the 1980s. The Herald Diary used to be edited by writer Tom Shields. Sean Connery once said: "First thing each morning I turn to The Herald on my computer – first for its witty Diary, which helps keep my Scots sense of humour in tune."

== Publishing and circulation ==
Circulation in 1831 was 1,600, 3,200 in 1840 and had risen to 5,200 by 1854.

It is currently printed at Carmyle, just south east of Glasgow. The paper is published Monday to Saturday in Glasgow and as of 2017 it had an audited circulation of 28,900. The Herald's website is protected by a paywall. It is part of the Newsquest Scotland stable of sites, which have 41m page views a month.

== Political stance ==
The Herald declares in every edition that it does not endorse any political party. However, the newspaper backed a 'No' vote in the 2014 referendum on Scottish independence. The accompanying headline stated, "The Herald's view: we back staying within UK, but only if there's more far-reaching further devolution."

== See also ==
- List of newspapers in Scotland
