= Hawick News =

Scottish tabloid newspaper

- Type: Local Weekly Newspaper
- Format: Tabloid
- Owner(s): Johnston Press plc
- Editor: Jason Marshall
- Ceased publication: 21 June 2019
- Headquarters: Hawick, Scottish Borders
- Website: www.hawick-news.co.uk

Hawick News was a tabloid newspaper that covers the area of Hawick, one of the larger towns in the Scottish Borders. It included local news, politics, and sport. It was part of Johnston Press subsidiary Tweeddale Press Group. Contributors to the newspaper include regular sports columnist Thomas Clark, rugby correspondent Alexander McLeman,

Sports reporter John Florence received the unsung hero award at the 2008 James McLean Trust (JMT) Awards.

The Hawick News ceased publishing Friday, June 21st, 2019
