= Wishaw Press =

Scottish newspaper

- Type: Weekly newspaper
- Format: Tabloid
- Owner(s): Reach plc (trading as Scottish & Universal Newspapers Ltd)
- Editor: John Murdoch
- Headquarters: Airdrie, North Lanarkshire
- Circulation: 854 (as of 2023)
- Website: wishawpress.co.uk

The Wishaw Press is a Scottish newspaper that covers Wishaw and the surrounding towns and villages in North Lanarkshire, such as Motherwell, Newmains and Carluke. The paper is owned by Reach plc, and is printed weekly at its office in Airdrie.
