= The Southern Reporter =

- Type: Weekly newspaper
- Format: Tabloid
- Owner: National World
- Editor: Darin Hutson
- Founded: 1855
- Headquarters: Selkirk, Borders, Scotland
- Circulation: 3,352 (as of 2023)
- ISSN: 1355-9346
- OCLC number: 500155716
- Website: thesouthernreporter.co.uk

The Southern Reporter is a weekly tabloid format sold in the Scottish Borders. It publishes Thursdays and is owned by National World.

== History ==
The paper was established in 1855.

The Tweeddale Press Group owned the title and became a subsidiary of the Johnston Press in 2000, having been purchased for £7.8 million. It was named the best weekly newspaper in Scotland in 2002 and 2003. In 2004 the paper published a caption which caused offence locally, causing the editor to resign. Susan Windram succeeded Willie Mack as editor in 2007. Windram was succeeded by Phil Johnson, who was appointed in June 2015. Darin Hutson was appointed editor in 2016.

In 2012 Johnston Press announced that the office would be closing and relocating to other premises in Selkirk. The move was completed in April 2014.

In 2013 the newspaper switched to tabloid format after more than 150 years as a broadsheet. After a progressive decline in circulation, the average circulation of paid copies was around 12,500 for each issue.
