= Glossop Advertiser =

English newspaper

- Type: Weekly newspaper
- Format: Tabloid
- Owner: Reach plc
- Editor: Claire Mooney
- Headquarters: Manchester, England
- Circulation: 12,896 (Jul–Dec 2007)
- Price: Free to residents in the town of Glossop, Derbyshire, or £0.36 in stores
- Website: glossopadvertiser.co.uk

The Glossop Advertiser is a weekly newspaper which serves the town of Glossop, Derbyshire, England. It is owned by Trinity Mirror plc. The paper's sister paper, The Tameside Advertiser which is also a freesheet but covers the neighbouring Metropolitan Borough of Tameside in Greater Manchester. The main competitors to both papers are the Tameside Reporter and Glossop Chronicle which are both paid-for newspapers. The Glossop Advertiser is essentially a localised version of the Tameside Advertiser with some news stories specific to the area, but much of the content is generalised between the two newspapers.

In February 2010, the owners of the Glossop Advertiser, Guardian Media Group, sold it along with the flagship Manchester Evening News and 22 other local titles to Trinity Mirror plc.

== See also ==
- Tameside Advertiser (The Glossop Advertiser's sister newspaper)
