= Manchester Metro News =

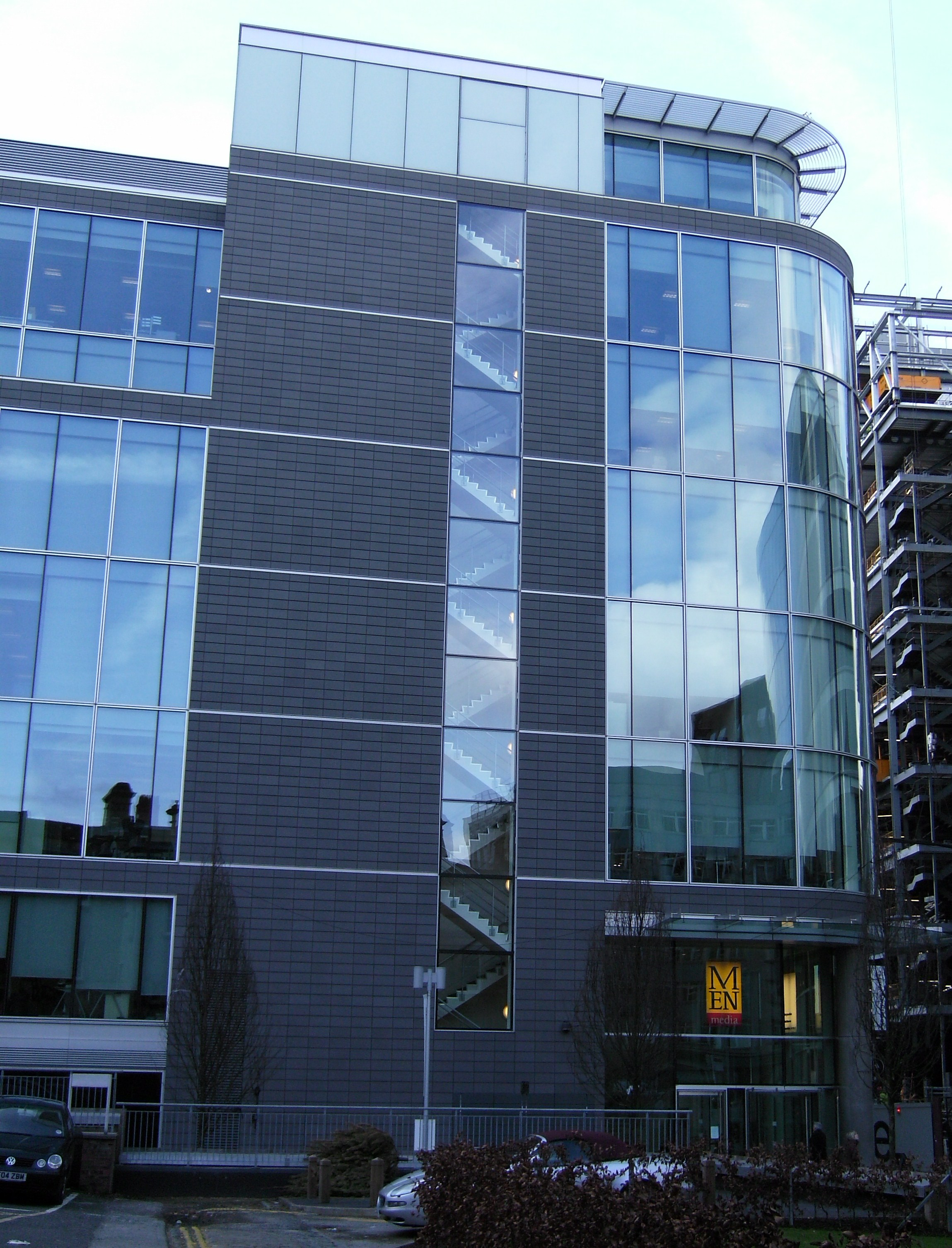
MEN Media HQ in Manchester

The Manchester Metro News was a British weekly newspaper published each Friday by Reach plc. It was established in 1987 as a free sister paper to the Manchester Evening News featuring a round up of the week's news. It was Britain's most-circulated free newspaper before being passed by London Metro in August 1999. The paper had three separate geographical editions: City (in south and east Manchester), Trafford (in Trafford and Wythenshawe) and Stockport (in Stockport and Wilmslow). In 2007, Guardian Media Group streamlined its operations and merged two of the editions into the weekly newspaper owned by GMG in their areas. The Trafford edition was unaffected.
