= Blairgowrie Advertiser =

Scottish newspaper

- Owner(s): Reach plc
- Circulation: 621 (as of 2023)
- Website: dailyrecord.co.uk

The Blairgowrie Advertiser is a Scottish newspaper covering the Blairgowrie area. The paper is owned by Reach plc.
