= Northumberland Gazette =

Newspaper

- Type: Weekly newspaper
- Format: Tabloid
- Owner(s): National World
- Editor: Amanda Bourn
- Founded: 1854
- Language: English (UK)
- Headquarters: 32 Bondgate Without, Alnwick
- Circulation: 2040 (as of 2024)
- ISSN: 1354-9189
- Website: northumberlandgazette.co.uk

The Northumberland Gazette is a weekly newspaper published in Alnwick, Northumberland, England. It serves Alnwick, Amble, Seahouses, Rothbury, Wooler and outlying districts.

The Gazette typically covers local news, sport, leisure and farming issues. It also prints opinion pieces, reader letters, and classified advertisements, and contains a property and real estate pull-out section. It is published and owned by National World.

== History ==
The newspaper was founded by William Davison of Alnwick in 1854 as the Alnwick Mercury, an 8-page penny monthly. After Davison died in 1858, the business passed to his son, who sold it to Henry Hunter Blair in 1859. By 1864 it was a 4-page weekly. Historical copies of the Alnwick Mercury, dating back to 1854, are available to search and view in digitised form at The British Newspaper Archive.

In 1883 the paper merged with the Alnwick and County Gazette as an 8-page penny weekly, the politically Conservative Alnwick and County Gazette and Alnwick Mercury. It continued the numbering of the Mercury. In 1924 the newspaper incorporated the Alnwick Guardian, becoming the Alnwick and County Gazette and Guardian. The title changed to the Northumberland and Alnwick Gazette in 1943, and to the Northumberland Gazette in 1947. For most of its history it has been in the same ownership as the South Shields daily evening newspaper, the Shields Gazette.

For several years the paper was published in several editions covering different districts in east Northumberland, including one for Berwick upon Tweed from no later than 1972 until 1984 or after, one for Morpeth from at least 1946 until 1992, from 1972 under the masthead Morpeth Gazette, for Rothbury and Wooler from about 1954 to 1957, a Wooler edition until 1972 or after, and a Ponteland edition from 1974 to 1992, in latter years under the masthead Ponteland Gazette. This pattern ended in 1992 when the Gazette's publisher, Northeast Press (then part of Portsmouth and Sunderland Newspapers) bought the Alnwick Advertiser (established in 1979) and the Morpeth Herald from the Tweeddale Press Group. The Advertiser was incorporated in the Gazette and the Morpeth and Ponteland editions of the Gazette ended.

== Move to premium content ==
The paper's parent group, Johnston Press, decided to use the Northumberland Gazette as its first news site for accessing its premium content online. This scheme was abandoned.

On 31 May 2012 the Gazette, hitherto a broadsheet, was part of the first wave of Johnston Press titles to be relaunched in one of five uniform tabloid formats.
