= Tameside Advertiser =

Weekly local newspaper

- Type: Weekly newspaper
- Format: Tabloid
- Owner(s): Trinity Mirror plc
- Editor: Claire Mooney
- Headquarters: Manchester, England
- Circulation: 91,151 (Jul-Dec 2007)
- Price: Free to residents in the Tameside area, or £0.36 in stores
- Website: tamesideadvertiser.co.uk

The Tameside Advertiser is a weekly newspaper which serves the Metropolitan Borough of Tameside, Greater Manchester, England. It is owned by Trinity Mirror plc. The paper has a sister paper, The Glossop Advertiser which is also a freesheet but covers the bordering town of Glossop in Derbyshire. The main competitors to both papers are the Tameside Reporter and Glossop Chronicle which are both paid-for newspapers. The newspaper recently featured in the 'Rotten Boroughs' section of Private Eye magazine after the Department for Communities and Local Government produced the whitepaper 'Guidance for local authorities on community cohesion contingency planning and tension monitoring'. The whitepaper revealed that:

"Tameside holds regular meetings with local newspaper editors to gather information and stop sensationalist reporting which might otherwise start or add to rising tensions, e.g. in response to a Kick Racism out of Football campaign, an extremist political group wanted to picket a local football stadium. A local newspaper was going to print the story on its front page – an action that was likely to bring unwanted publicity to the picket and fuel rising community tensions. The intervention of the Community Cohesion Partnership prevented the story from being run and in the event no-one turned out for the picket."

The editor was forced to respond to these allegations in Private Eye.

In February 2010, the newspaper along with other local titles in the North of England and Surrey and Berkshire, including the Manchester Evening News were sold to Trinity Mirror plc.
