= Paisley Daily Express =

Scottish newspaper based in Glasgow, covering the Renfrewshire area

- Type: Daily newspaper
- Format: Tabloid
- Owner(s): Reach plc
- Editor: Gavin Mcinally
- Founded: 1874
- Headquarters: Anderston, Glasgow
- Circulation: 1,233 (as of 2024)
- Website: paisleydailyexpress.co.uk

The Paisley Daily Express is a Scottish newspaper based in Glasgow, covering the Renfrewshire area. The paper, which is currently owned by Reach plc has its main offices in Glasgow. The paper is sold in newsagents and general stores throughout Renfrewshire. The contents of the "Wee Express", as it is known locally (to distinguish it from the "Big Express" i.e. the Scottish Daily Express) are typical of a local newspaper: local news, human interest stories, classified advertisements, intimations, church news, crosswords, wedding photographs, school photographs, local sports (mainly about the town's football team St Mirren), letters to the editor and so on.

The paper was once based in New Street in Paisley, but its main editorial operation was relocated to Glasgow in March 2012. A small office within Paisley's YMCA building serves the paper.
