= Hamilton Advertiser =

Scottish tabloid

- Type: Weekly newspaper
- Format: Tabloid
- Owner(s): Reach plc (trading as Scottish & Universal Newspapers Ltd)
- Editor: Robert Mitchell
- Headquarters: Glasgow, Scotland
- Circulation: 1,325 (as of 2023)
- Website: www.hamiltonadvertiser.co.uk

The Hamilton Advertiser is a Scottish tabloid newspaper that covers the area and the suburbs of Hamilton, a large burgh in South Lanarkshire. It is the longest-running newspaper in the town and is owned by Scottish & Universal Newspapers Limited, a division of Reach plc. It was printed weekly at the town's Press Buildings in Campbell Street before moving to Brandon Street in 2017. In November 2019, production of the paper was moved to Central Quay in Glasgow, Reach plc's Scottish HQ.
