= Rutherglen Reformer =

Newspaper

- Type: Weekly newspaper
- Format: Tabloid
- Owner(s): Reach plc (trading as Scottish & Universal Newspapers Ltd)
- Editor: John Rowbotham
- Staff writers: Kenny Smith, Margaret Shaw
- Founded: 1875
- Headquarters: Hamilton, South Lanarkshire
- Circulation: 434 (as of 2023)
- Website: www.dailyrecord.co.uk/all-about/rutherglen

The Rutherglen Reformer is a newspaper covering the Royal Burgh of Rutherglen, South Lanarkshire, a former Glasgow City Council area. It was established in 1875.

The paper is now owned by Reach plc and is printed weekly at the Press Buildings in Hamilton.
