= Dumfries & Galloway Standard =

- Type: Twice weekly
- Format: Tabloid
- Owner(s): Scottish & Universal Newspapers Limited
- Publisher: Reach plc
- Founded: 1853
- Language: English
- Headquarters: Dumfries
- Website: www.dgstandard.co.uk

The Dumfries & Galloway Standard is a tabloid newspaper which primarily serves Dumfries and the surrounding towns and villages such as Thornhill, Sanquhar, Lockerbie and Annan. But it also covers Castle Douglas, Kirkcudbright, Gretna and news in Wigtownshire such as in the town of Stranraer. Its sister paper is the Galloway News which covers the Galloway area more in depth with Castle Douglas, Kirkcudbright and Dalbeattie the three main towns in its patch. Both are part of Reach plc.

The Standard, as it is colloquially known, was established in 1853 and prints twice weekly on a Wednesday and a Friday. It was the 2003 regional newspaper of the year. It was named Weekly Newspaper of the Year in Scotland by the Newspaper Society in 2007 and also won Scottish Weekly Newspaper of the Year at the Scottish Press Awards in May 2010.
