= Herald (newspaper) =

Herald or The Herald is the name of various newspapers.

== Herald or The Herald ==
=== Australia ===
- The Herald (Adelaide) and several similar names (1894–1924), a South Australian Labor weekly, then daily
- Barossa and Light Herald (1951–2024), Tanunda, South Australia
- Fremantle Herald, Fremantle, Western Australia
  - The Herald (1867–1886)
  - Fremantle Herald (1913–1919)
  - Fremantle Herald (1989–present)
- The Herald (Melbourne) (1840–1990)
- Newcastle Herald, Newcastle, New South Wales
- The Port Phillip Herald and The Herald (Melbourne) (1840–1990), Melbourne, Victoria

=== Canada ===
- Calgary Herald, Calgary, Alberta
- Lethbridge Herald, Lethbridge, Alberta
- Newfoundland Herald (1946-2022), Newfoundland and Labrador
- Oxbow Herald, Oxbow, Saskatchewan – see List of newspapers in Canada
- Penticton Herald, Penticton, British Columbia

=== United Kingdom ===
- Brighton Herald (1806–1971), Brighton and Hove, England
- Bucks Herald, Buckinghamshire, England
- Eastbourne Herald, Eastbourne, England
- Falkirk Herald, Grangemouth, Scotland
- Fermanagh Herald, County Fermanagh, Northern Ireland
- The Herald (Glasgow), Glasgow, Scotland
- The Herald (Plymouth), Plymouth, England
- Ulster Herald, Omagh, Tyrone, Northern Ireland

=== United States ===
- The Albany Herald, Albany, Georgia
- The Badger Herald, Madison, Wisconsin
- Baker City Herald, Baker City, Oregon
- The Bellingham Herald, Bellingham, Washington
- Boston Herald, Boston, Massachusetts
- The Bradenton Herald, Bradenton, Florida
- Canby Herald, Oregon
- Cape May County Herald, Cape May County, New Jersey
- Chicago Herald (disambiguation), several newspapers in Chicago
- Clinton Herald, Clinton, Iowa
- College Heights Herald, student newspaper, Western Kentucky University, Bowling Green, Kentucky
- The Concrete Herald, Concrete, Washington
- Dallas Herald (1849–1885), Dallas, Texas
- Dallas Herald (1886–1888), Dallas, Texas
- The Dickson Herald, Dickson, Tennessee
- The Everett Herald, Everett, Washington
- Grand Forks Herald, Grand Forks, North Dakota
- Headlight Herald (disambiguation), several newspapers
- Los Angeles Herald which merged with the Los Angeles Express to form the Los Angeles Herald-Express
- Miami Herald, Miami, Florida
- New York Herald (1835–1924), New York City, New York
- Northwest Herald, Crystal Lake, Illinois
- The Portsmouth Herald, Portsmouth, New Hampshire
- The Herald (Rock Hill), Rock Hill, South Carolina
- Rutland Herald, Rutland, Vermont
- San Francisco Herald, San Francisco, California
- The Herald (Sharon), Sharon, Pennsylvania
- Sierra Vista Herald, Sierra Vista, Arizona
- Statesboro Herald, Statesboro, Georgia
- Tri-City Herald, Kennewick, Washington
- Williston Herald, Williston, South Dakota
- Herald (Community of Christ), formerly The True Latter Day Saints' Herald and The Saints' Herald

=== Other countries ===
- Buenos Aires Herald, Buenos Aires, Argentina
- Deccan Herald, Bangalore, India
- Gisborne Herald, New Zealand
- Suriname Herald, Paramaribo, a newspaper in Suriname
- The Herald (Ireland), Dublin, Ireland
- The Korea Herald, Seoul, South Korea
- Herald Malaysia, Kuala Lumpur, Malaysia
- The Herald Mexico, Mexico City, Mexico
- The New Zealand Herald, Auckland, New Zealand
- The Herald (Nigeria), Kwara State, Nigeria
- The Herald (Pakistan), Karachi, Pakistan
- The Herald (South Africa)
- The Herald (Zimbabwe), Harare, Zimbabwe

== Daily Herald ==
- Daily Herald (United Kingdom) (1912–1964), a left-wing British newspaper
- Daily Herald (Adelaide) (1910–1924), an Australian Labor Party newspaper in South Australia
- Daily Herald (Arlington Heights, Illinois), US
- Austin Daily Herald, Austin, Minnesota, US
- The Brown Daily Herald, the student newspaper of Brown University, Providence, Rhode Island, US
- Daily Herald (Columbia, Tennessee), US
- Daily Herald (Connecticut), a former weekly newspaper in Connecticut, US
- Fairborn Daily Herald, Fairborn, Ohio, US
- Prince Albert Daily Herald, Prince Albert, Saskatchewan, Canada
- Daily Herald (Roanoke Rapids), North Carolina, US
- Daily Herald (Sint Maarten) – see Outline of Saint Martin
- Tyrone Daily Herald, Tyrone, Pennsylvania, US
- Daily Herald (Utah), Utah County, Utah, US
- Wausau Daily Herald, Wausau, Wisconsin, US
- The Daily Herald, a predecessor newspaper to the Sun Herald, Biloxi, Mississippi, US
- The Daily Herald, a predecessor newspaper to The Mercury News, San Jose, California, US

== Evening Herald ==
Entries in this section are listed alphabetically by country, then by state/province or area

- Evening Herald, former name of The Herald (Ireland)
- The Evening Herald, former name of the historical The Wanganui Herald of New Zealand
- Evening Herald, a companion newspaper of the historical Morning Herald, United Kingdom
- Evening Herald, a former name of The Herald (Plymouth), United Kingdom
- Evening Herald, a predecessor of the Herald Express of the Torbay area, United Kingdom
- Los Angeles Evening Herald and Express, a former name of the historical Los Angeles Herald-Express in California, United States
- The Evening Herald, a former name of The Bradenton Herald in Florida, United States
- The Evening Herald, a predecessor of The Herald-Palladium of St. Joseph, Michigan, United States
- Shenandoah Evening Herald, a predecessor of the Republican Herald of Pottsville, Pennsylvania, United States
- The Evening Herald, former name of The Herald (Rock Hill) in South Carolina, United States
- Evening Herald, a predecessor of the Herald and News of Klamath Falls, Oregon, United States

== Morning Herald ==
- Morning Herald (1790–1869), an early newspaper in the United Kingdom
- Baltimore Morning Herald (1900–1906), Baltimore, Maryland, U.S.
- The Sydney Morning Herald, Sydney, Australia
- The Morning Herald, a predecessor of The Herald-Mail, Hagerstown, Maryland, U.S.

== National Herald ==
- The National Herald, New York City, U.S., focusing on the Greek-American community
- National Herald (1938–2008), an Indian newspaper established by Jawaharlal Nehru

== Sunday Herald ==
- Sunday Graphic (1915–1960), also known as the Sunday Herald and Illustrated Sunday Herald
- Sunday Herald, Scotland
- Sunday Herald (Australia), Sunday edition of The Sydney Morning Herald now merged with the Sunday Sun to become The Sun-Herald
- Sunday Herald, based in Kingston, Jamaica
- Herald on Sunday, Sunday edition of The New Zealand Herald

== Fictional ==
- The Washington Herald (House of Cards), a fictional daily investigative newspaper in the Netflix TV series House of Cards

== See also ==
=== Herald Journal or Herald-Journal ===
- The Herald Journal, in Northern Utah
- Spartanburg Herald-Journal, Spartanburg, South Carolina
- Syracuse Herald-Journal (1939–2001), Syracuse, New York, U.S.
- Herald Journal, Monticello, Indiana, U.S.

=== Press Herald, Press-Herald, Herald Press, or Herald-Press ===
- The Herald-Press (Harvey, North Dakota), U.S.
- Huntington Herald-Press, Huntington County, Indiana, U.S.
- Minden Press-Herald, Minden, Louisiana, U.S.; see Bogalusa Daily News
- Portland Press Herald, Portland, Maine, U.S.
- Palestine Herald-Press, Palestine, Texas, U.S.
- The Herald-Press, a defunct Michigan newspaper that merged with The Herald-Palladium, U.S.

=== Tribune Herald, Tribune-Herald, Herald Tribune, or Herald-Tribune ===
- Grande Prairie Daily Herald-Tribune, Grande Prairie, Alberta, Canada
- Hawaii Tribune-Herald, Hilo, Hawaii, U.S.
- Herald & Tribune (1869–present), Jonesborough, Tennessee, U.S.
- Hawke's Bay Herald-Tribune (1937–1999), Hawke's Bay, New Zealand
- International Herald Tribune (1967–2013)
- Latin American Herald Tribune, an online-only newspaper, Caracas, Venezuela
- New York Herald Tribune (1924–1966), New York, U.S.
- Sarasota Herald-Tribune, Sarasota, Florida, U.S.
- Waco Tribune-Herald, Waco, Texas, U.S.

=== Other ===
- El Heraldo (disambiguation)
- Albany Democrat-Herald, Albany, Oregon, U.S.
- Athens Banner-Herald, Athens, Georgia, U.S.
- Catholic Herald, London, England
- The Chronicle Herald, Halifax, Nova Scotia, Canada
- Dallas Times Herald (1888–1991), Dallas, Texas
- Gazette and Herald, North Wiltshire, England
- Hawaii Catholic Herald, Honolulu, Hawaii, U.S.
- The Herald-Dispatch, Huntington, West Virginia, U.S.
- The Herald-Mail, Hagerstown, Maryland, U.S.
- The Herald-Palladium, Michigan, U.S.
- Herald Sun, Melbourne, Victoria, Australia
- Innis Herald, a college newspaper in Ontario, Canada. See List of newspapers in Canada
- Lexington Herald-Leader, Lexington, Kentucky, U.S.
- Los Angeles Herald Examiner
- Metro Herald (Irish newspaper)
- Metro Herald (Virginia)
- Newnan Times-Herald, Newnan, Georgia, U.S.
- El Nuevo Herald, Miami, Florida, U.S.
- O Heraldo, Goa, India
- Omaha World-Herald, Omaha, Nebraska, U.S.
- Record Herald, formerly Washington C.H. Record-Herald, Washington Court House, Ohio, U.S.
- The Record Herald, Waynesboro, Pennsylvania, U.S.
- Sun Herald, Biloxi, Mississippi, U.S.
- Swansea Herald of Wales, south Wales
- Telegraph Herald, Dubuque, Iowa, U.S.
- Times Herald-Record, Middletown, New York, U.S.
- Torquay Herald Express, South Devon, England
- Universal Circulating Herald, British Hong Kong
