= Donegal News =

Irish newspaper

- Friday edition
- Type: Twice-weekly newspaper
- Format: Tabloid
- Owner: North West of Ireland Printing and Publishing Company
- Editor: Columba Gill
- Founded: 1903
- Political alignment: Nationalist
- Headquarters: Letterkenny, County Donegal
- Circulation: Monday: 4,221*; Friday: 10,861*; ABC July to December 2012.
- Price: €1.45, £1.20 (stg)
- Website: www.donegalnews.com

The Donegal News, also known as the Derry People/Donegal News and formerly the Derry People, is a twice-weekly regional newspaper serving the northwest of the island of Ireland (including its Border Region). Originally covering Derry, Ireland, it was first published in 1902. However, at the beginning of the Second World War, it moved across the border which the British government in London established by creating Northern Ireland when it partitioned the island in the early 1920s. The newspaper then settled in Letterkenny, and took on more of an emphasis on issues related to County Donegal.

It is owned by the North West of Ireland Printing and Publishing Company, which was established in 1901 by the Lynch family, who also own several other papers in the region, among them the Ulster Herald, Fermanagh Herald, Strabane Chronicle, Tyrone Herald, and Gaelic Life.

The newspaper's main competitors are the Donegal Democrat and Derry Journal. Despite a "rebranding" several years ago, it continues to be known – in shortened form – across the northern half of County Donegal as the Derry People. Its two editions had a circulation of 15,467 for the first half of 2010, with its Friday edition accounting for most of this figure.

== History ==
The paper was first published in Derry in 1903, but at the start of the Second World War, the paper's owners decided to move production across the border to Letterkenny, County Donegal, in an aim to avoid possible harsh censorship laws, which saw the paper's rival, the Derry Journal, being banned for a short time on both sides of the border. The paper has always had a nationalist editorial policy and so was able to attract readers from both County Donegal and the mostly nationalist city of Derry. The paper became the first to be based in Letterkenny and after the war had ended, it decided to keep production in the Republic and gradually began to focus more on northern Donegal rather than its original Derry base. Derry has always been an important centre of employment for the north of Donegal with many Donegal families also moving across the border, which led to papers such as the Derry Journal and the Derry People, building up a loyal readership in both jurisdictions. Throughout its history, the paper has remained under the control of the Lynch family, whose North West of Ireland Printing and Publishing Company is the largest newspaper group in Ireland still family controlled.

As of 2020, it had not missed publication since its foundation in 1903.

== Monday edition ==
The Monday edition was launched in November 2006 and is first paper in the County with all the weekend news and sport.

== Layout ==
In 2002 the paper was renamed as the Donegal News, with the Derry People title kept in the masthead, and was part of a wider re-launch of the paper that saw an overhaul of its layout. However, despite the 'rebranding', the paper continues to be known locally, for short, as The Derry People.

On 18 October 2008 the Friday edition of the paper went tabloid. The change followed extensive surveys which returned a massive thumbs-up for a smaller paper. New farming, business and fashion columns were introduced. Also included are pull-outs devoted to local notes and entertainment. In keeping with the paper's proud and close association with Letterkenny, The Letterkenny Notes remained on page two of the newspaper. The sports section is now located at the back of the paper.

== Content ==
As part of the paper's re-start in 2002, a new layout was introduced which increased the number of pages of the publication, as well as the number of these in colour. The Donegal News mainly reports on local events and local sport, as well as devoting space to "local notes", where unpaid correspondents submit reports on births, deaths and marriages in their particular town.

In the Friday edition, a number of regular features are also carried, such as "Friday Talk" and "The Last Corncrake", as well as a column in the Irish language, "Scéal Eile". The Friday edition also carries a weekly lifestyle supplement called "DN", with regular columns relating to television, cinema, travel, health and local entertainment.

The Monday edition of the newspaper features a comic strip, Donegal Danny, by Johnny Schumann and Sean Feeny while "People Like You" features an interview with a local celebrity.

Both editions of the paper are made available on-line as paid-for 'e-books', while the "DN" supplement is made available free of charge.

== Circulation ==
According to ABC, the average circulation of Donegal News Monday was 4,221 for the period July 2012 to December 2012, this represented an increase of 4% on a year-on-year basis. The average circulation of Donegal News Friday was 10.861 for the period July 2012 to December 2012, this represented a decrease of 3% on a year-on-year basis.

== Sports Personality of the Month ==
The Donegal News Sports Personality of the Month is a monthly prize presented by the Donegal News to a person who has excelled in the performance of their chosen sport.

It is run in conjunction with Brian McCormick Sports.

Sports represented include Gaelic football, boxing, athletics, association football, rugby union, motorcycling, motorsport, and hockey.

Olympic athletes honoured include Brendan Boyce, Mark English and Caitriona Jennings.

Gaelic footballers honoured include the All-Ireland Senior Football Championship-winning players Neil Gallagher, Rory Kavanagh, Karl Lacey, Patrick McBrearty, Frank McGlynn, as well as team captain Michael Murphy and manager Jim McGuinness.

=== 2012 ===
- January: Paddy Peoples (association football centre back)
- February: Danny Mooney (athletics)
- March: Michael Gallagher (boxing)
- April: Caitriona Jennings (athletics)
- May: Mark English (athletics)
- June: Frank McGlynn (Gaelic football)
- July: Jim McGuinness (Gaelic football manager)
- August: Neil Gallagher (Gaelic football midfielder)
- September: Michael Murphy (Gaelic football captain)
- October: Brett McGinty (boxing)
- November: ?
- December: Jason Quigley (boxing)

=== 2013 ===
- January: ?
- February: ?
- March: ?
- April: ?
- May: Patrick McBrearty (Gaelic football forward)
- June: Jason Quigley (boxing)
- July: Mark English (athletics)
- August: Brendan Boyce (race walking)
- September: ?
- October: Rory Kavanagh (Gaelic football)
- November: Gary McDaid (Gaelic football)
- December: ?

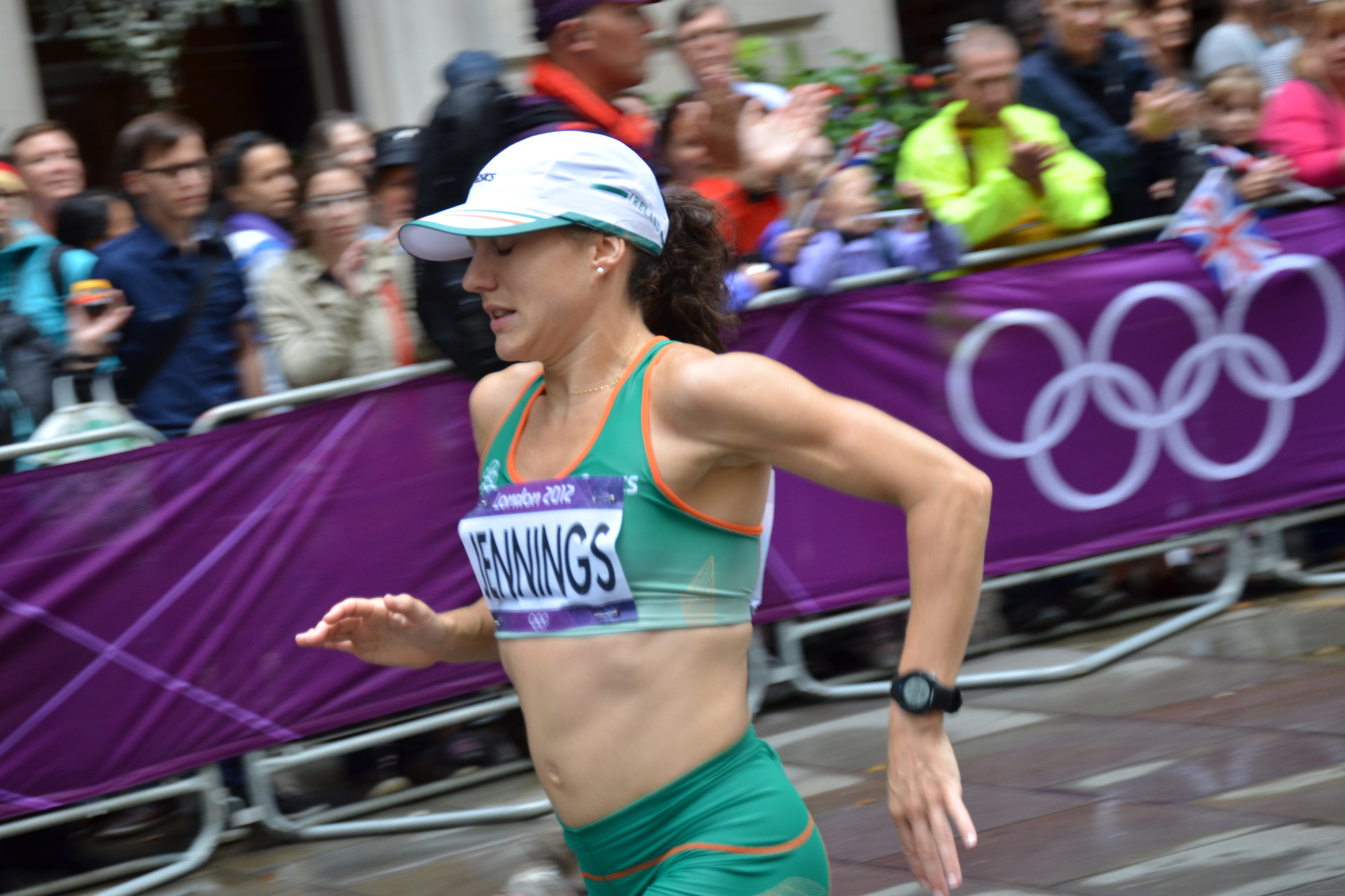
Caitriona Jennings won the Donegal News Sports Personality of the Month in April 2012.

=== 2014 ===
- January: ?
- February: Aaron McGlynn (athletics)
- March: ?
- April: Eamonn Sheridan (association football)
- May: Karl Lacey (Gaelic football)
- June: Declan Boyle (rallying)
- July: Ryan McHugh (Gaelic football)
- August: Mark English (athletics)
- September: ?
- October: ?
- November: Geraldine McLaughlin (Gaelic football)
- December: Ann Marie McGlynn (athletics)

=== 2015 ===
- January: ?
- February: ?
- March: ?
- April: ?
- May: ?
- June: ?
- July: Yvonne McMonagle (Gaelic football)
- August: ?
- September: ?
- October: ?
- November: ?
- December: Niall O'Donnell (Gaelic football)

=== 2016 ===
- January: ?
- February: Darren McElwaine (association football)
- March: Rhys Irwin (racing)
- April: Denise McElhinney (hockey)
- May: Karen Guthrie (Gaelic football)
- June: Manus Kelly (rallying)
- July: Peadar Mogan (Gaelic football)
- August: ?
- September: Aidan Callaghan (triathlon)
- October: ?
- November: Grainne Russell (swimming)
- December: ?

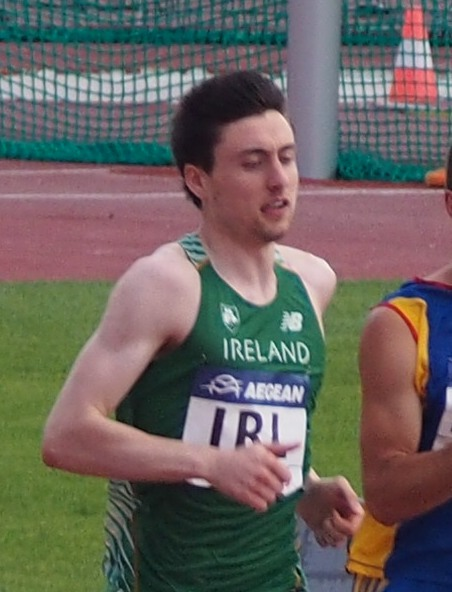
Mark English won in May 2012, July 2013 and August 2014.

=== 2017 ===
- January: Paddy Bond (swimming)
- February: ?
- March: Marty Lynch
- April: Conor McMenamin (rugby union)
- May: ?
- June: Manus Kelly (rallying)
- July: ?
- August: ?
- September: Tyler Toland (association football)
- October: Michael Hegarty (Gaelic football)
- November: ?
- December: ?

=== 2018 ===
- January: Catherine Grier (association football)
- February: ?
- March: ?
- April: ?
- May: ?
- June: ?
- July: ?
- August:
- September: Daragh Ellison (association football captain)
- October: ?
- November: ?
- December: ?

=== 2019 ===
- January: ?
- February: ?
- March: Patrick Quinlivan (gymnastics)
- April: ?
- May: ?
- June: ?
- July: ?
- August: ?
- September: ?
- October: Ethan O'Donnell (Gaelic football)
- November: Matthew McCole (boxing)
- December: Jamie Grant (Gaelic football)

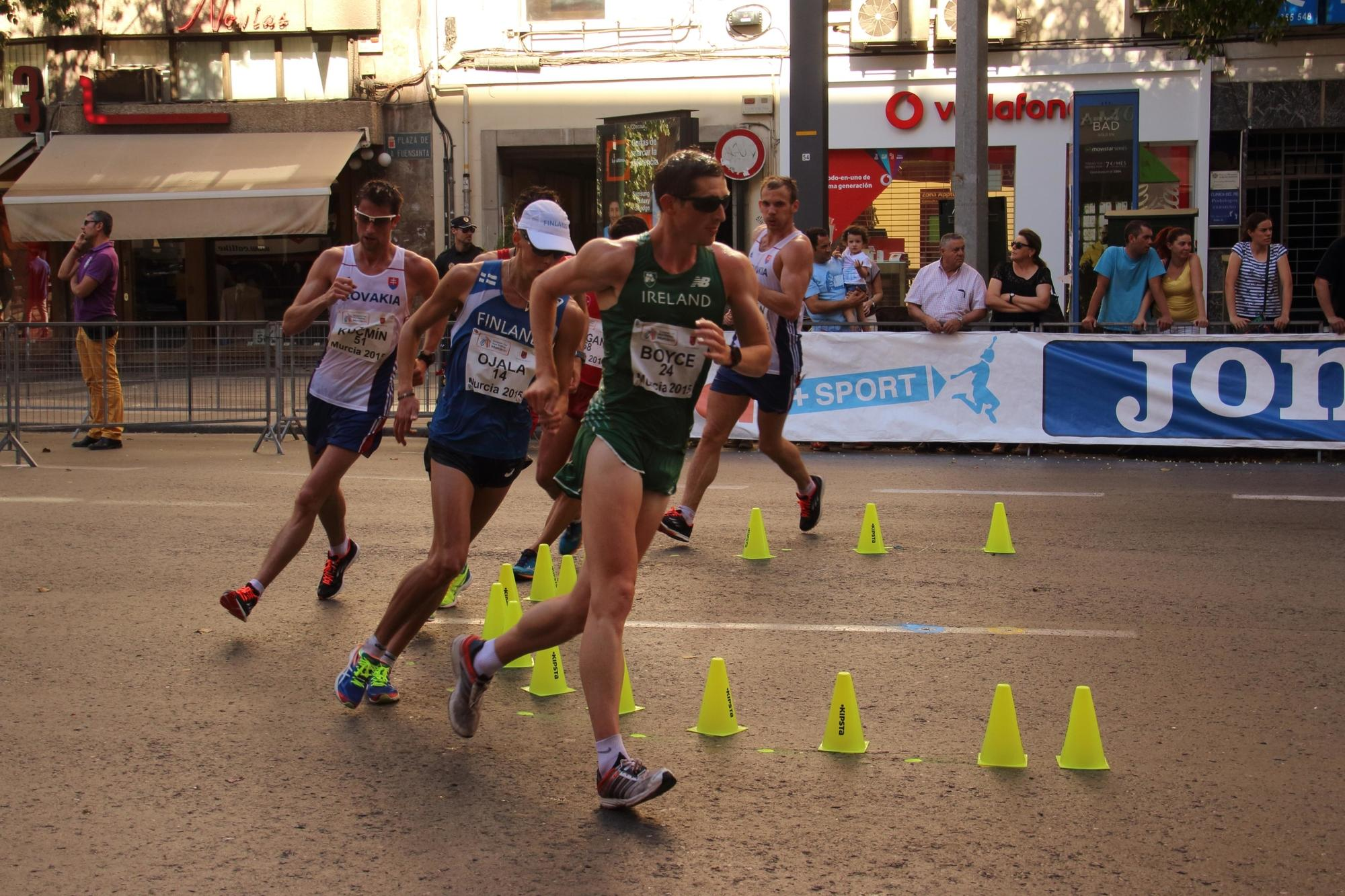
Brendan Boyce won in August 2013.

=== 2020 ===
- January: Killian Gribben (basketball)
- February: Ronan McGeehin (Gaelic football goalkeeper)
- March: Declan Coulter (hurling)
- April: No award given due to the COVID-19 pandemic's impact on sports
- May: No award given due to the COVID-19 pandemic's impact on sports
- June: No award given due to the COVID-19 pandemic's impact on sports
- July: Keith Cowan (association football)
- August: Brendan O'Donnell (hammer throwing)
- September: Oisin Orr (jockey)
- October: Mark Anthony McGinley (association football)
- November: Joe Boyle (hurling)
- December: Aoife Gallanagh (association football)

=== 2021 ===
- January: No award given due to the COVID-19 pandemic's impact on sports
- February: No award given due to the COVID-19 pandemic's impact on sports
- March: No award given due to the COVID-19 pandemic's impact on sports
- April: No award given due to the COVID-19 pandemic's impact on sports
- May: No award given due to the COVID-19 pandemic's impact on sports
- June: No award given due to the COVID-19 pandemic's impact on sports
- July: Adrienne Gallen (hammer throwing)
- August: Brendan Boyce (race walking)
- September: Helena Melly (pool)
- October: Dylan Browne McMonagle (horse racing)
- November: Kieran Tobin (Gaelic football)
- December: Ciara Grant (association football)

=== 2022 ===
- January: Shannon Ní Chuinneagáin (basketball)
- February: Ryan Griffin (golf)
- March: Riona Doherty (athletics)
- April: Peter Scott (rugby)
- May: Jack Parke (association football)
- June: Luke Witherow (hockey)
- July: John Kelly (shot put)
- August:
- September: Dylan Browne McMonagle (horse racing)
- October:
- November:
- December:

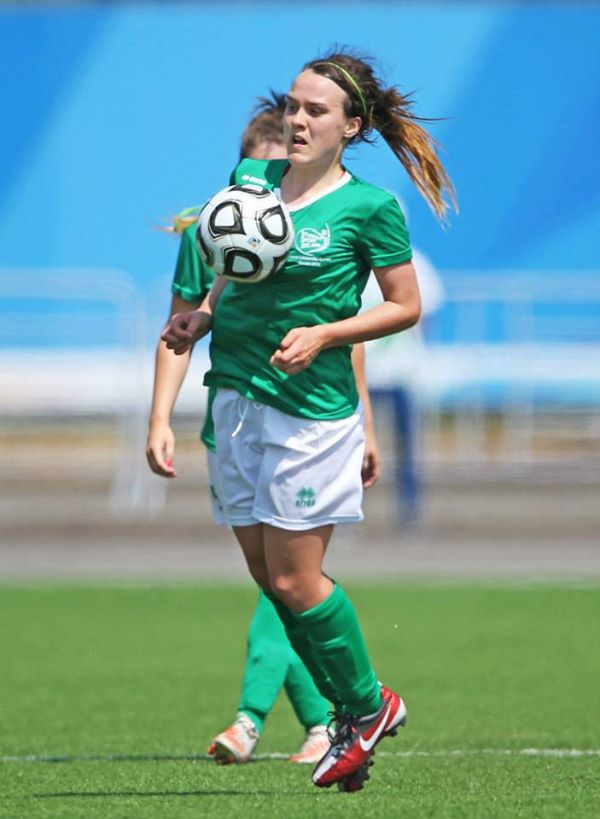
Ciara Grant won in December 2021.

=== 2023 ===
- January:
- February:
- March:
- April:
- May:
- June: Oisín Gallen (Gaelic football)
- July:
- August:
- September:
- October:
- November:
- December:

=== 2021 ===
Multiple winners

- Brendan Boyce (2013, 2021)
- Dylan Browne McMonagle (2021, 2022)
- Mark English (2012, 2013, 2014)
- Manus Kelly (2016, 2017)
- Jason Quigley (2012, 2013)
