= Metro Herald =

Metro Herald is the name of multiple newspapers:

- Metro Herald (Irish newspaper)
- Metro Herald (Virginia)

== See also ==
- Herald (newspaper)
