= The Herald-Press =

The Herald-Press may refer to:

- The Herald-Press of Harvey, North Dakota
- A former Michigan newspaper that merged, and became The Herald-Palladium of St. Joseph, Michigan

See also

- Herald (newspaper)#Herald Press, for newspapers with similar names
