= North West of Ireland Printing and Publishing Company =

Family-owned newspaper group

The North West of Ireland Printing and Publishing Company (NWIPP) is a family-owned newspaper group based in the Irish province of Ulster, both in Northern Ireland and the Republic of Ireland. The company was established in 1901 by the Lynch family with the launch of the Ulster Herald. The company expanded rapidly in the following years adding the Derry People (now Donegal News) and Fermanagh Herald in 1902; and purchased the Strabane Chronicle, which had been established in 1896. The Tyrone Herald was launched in November 2004, and a Monday edition of the Donegal News was also launched in November 2006. The company also publishes the weekly Gaelic games paper, Gaelic Life, starting in January 2007. The company is based in Omagh, County Tyrone. The group's circulation for the first half of 2010 (excluding Gaelic Life) was 53,038, making it one of the largest family-owned newspaper companies in Ireland.

== Titles ==
As of 2022, the publisher's titles include:

Name	Launched	Type	Circulation (as of 2010*)
Donegal News (Friday)	1902 as Derry People; Donegal News from 2002	Compact	11,480
Donegal News (Monday)	November 2006	Compact	3,987
Fermanagh Herald (Wednesday)	1902	Compact	13,169
Strabane Chronicle (Thursday)	1896	Compact	5,560
Tyrone Herald (Monday)	2004	Compact	6,531
Ulster Herald (Thursday)	1901	Compact	12,311
Gaelic Life (Friday)	January 2007	Compact	—

*Note: all UK Audit Bureau of Circulations figures for period January to June 2010
