= Mininder Kocher =

American orthopaedic surgeon

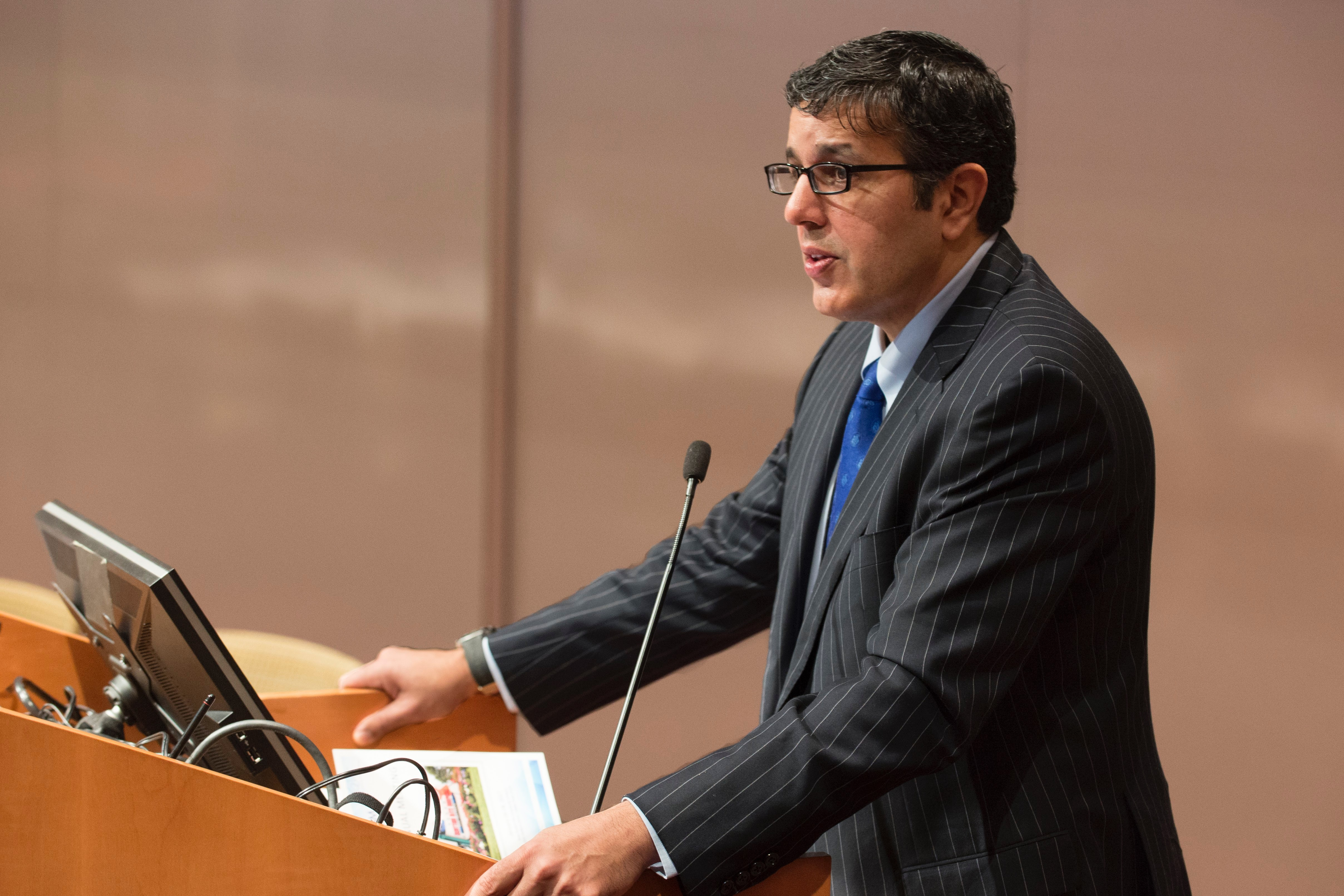
- Born: 23 December 1966 (age 59); Rochester, New York
- Education: Dartmouth College (BA phi beta kappa); Duke University School of Medicine(MD); Harvard School of Public Health (MPH); Harvard Business School (Program in Leadership Development)
- Occupation: Orthopedic surgeon
- Spouse: Michele Dupre
- Children: 5
- Scientific career
- Fields: Pediatric Orthopedic surgery Sports Medicine
- Workplaces: Boston Children’s Hospital; Harvard Medical School

Mininder S. Kocher is an American orthopedic surgeon, clinical epidemiologist, and pediatric sports medicine specialist. He is O'Donnell Family Endowed Chair and Chief of the Sports Medicine Division and Surgical Director – Satellites at Boston Children’s Hospital, Director of the Orthopedic Sports Medicine Fellowship, and Professor of Orthopedic Surgery at Harvard Medical School. He also serves as Team Orthopedic Consultant for Babson College and as Treasurer of the American Academy of Orthopaedic Surgeons (AAOS).

== Early life and education ==
Kocher was born in Rochester, New York, to Indian immigrant parents, his father a professor of thermodynamics, and his mother an elementary school teacher. He developed an early interest in science and engineering, participating in projects in his father’s lab, including designing and testing a Pinewood Derby car.

He attended McQuaid Jesuit High School where he was later awarded the Fr. Noonan Distinguished Alumnus Award.

Kocher became interested in orthopedic surgery after sustaining a meniscus injury in high school, which was treated by Dr. Ken DeHaven. This experience inspired him to pursue medicine, specifically orthopedics.

He completed his undergraduate studies at Dartmouth College in 1989, graduating Phi Beta Kappa and participating as a member of the junior varsity basketball team, the varsity track and field team, and the Beta Theta Pi fraternity. He earned his medical degree from Duke University School of Medicine in 1993 and graduated as a Davidson Scholar.

Kocher completed his internship at Beth Israel Deaconess Medical Center in 1994 and his residency through the Harvard Combined Orthopaedic Surgery Program in 1998, rotating through Massachusetts General, Brigham and Women’s, Beth Israel, and Children’s Hospitals. He completed a pediatric orthopedics fellowship at Boston Children’s Hospital in 1999 and a sports medicine and arthroscopic surgery fellowship at the Steadman Hawkins Clinic in 2000. He also earned a Master of Public Health in clinical epidemiology from the Harvard School of Public Health and completed the Program for Leadership Development at Harvard Business School in 2018.

== Academic and professional career ==
Kocher began his career at Boston Children’s Hospital and Harvard Medical School, where he currently serves as Chief of the Sports Medicine Division and Professor of Orthopedic Surgery. He also serves as Team Orthopedic Consultant for Babson College and is recognized internationally for his contributions to pediatric sports medicine.

Kocher has served on the Board of Directors and the Board of Specialty Societies of the American Academy of Orthopaedic Surgeons (AAOS), the Board of Directors of the American Orthopaedic Society for Sports Medicine (AOSSM), and from 2021–2022 as president of the Pediatric Orthopaedic Society of North America (POSNA). He is a founding member of the Pediatric Research in Sports Medicine Society and a member of professional organizations including the Herodicus Society, the International Pediatric Orthopaedic Think Tank (IPOTT), and the Twentieth Century Orthopaedic Society (TCOA). In 2025, he was elected Treasurer of the AAOS.

== Research ==
Kocher specializes in pediatric sports medicine, fracture care, and arthroscopic surgery of the knee, shoulder, hip, elbow, and ankle. His research emphasizes clinical epidemiology, biostatistics, and pediatric orthopedic outcomes. He has conducted prospective cohort studies, decision analyses, and survivorship analyses to improve diagnosis, treatment, and injury prevention in young athletes. His notable work includes prediction models for pediatric hip conditions and ACL injuries.

Kocher treats a high volume of pediatric and adolescent patients, performing over 600 operations annually. He is particularly known for addressing injuries related to early sports specialization and high-intensity youth athletics. He manages multidisciplinary programs for pediatric athletes, including concussion, bone, female athlete, and hip preservation clinics.

=== Publications and Recognition ===
Kocher has authored over 300 scientific articles, 150 book chapters, and eight textbooks. He has an h-index of 87, one of the highest in the field of orthopaedic surgery.

His research has received numerous awards, including the Kappa Delta Award, Angela Kuo Award, Arthur Heune Award, Vernon Thompson Award, and the OREF Clinical Research Award.

He has been recognized as one of “America’s Top Doctors” by Castle Connolly, among the “Top 17 Pediatric Orthopaedic Surgeons in North America” by RRY Publications, and received “Best of Boston” honors from Boston Magazine.

Kocher was first author on the 1999 publication "Differentiating Between Septic Arthritis and Transient Synovitis of the Hip in Children: An Evidence-Based Clinical Prediction Algorithm", where he introduced the Kocher criteria that are used to diagnose septic arthritis.

He has pioneered surgical techniques for the management of sports injuries in children including the Micheli-Kocher technique for ACL reconstruction in children with open growth plates and performed the first meniscus transplant in a skeletally immature child.

He has been featured in New York Times, NBC News, Scientific American, San Francisco Chronicle, Boston Globe, Wall Street Journal, Chicago Herald, ABC World News with Diane Sawyer, HBO Real Sports with Bryant Gumbel, and Sports Illustrated.

=== Personal life ===
Kocher is married to Michele Dupre, a civil engineer and former Dartmouth ski racer, whom he met on the Dartmouth Biology Foreign Study Program. They have five children and live on a farm outside Boston.
