= Paris Davis =

Retired United States Army colonel

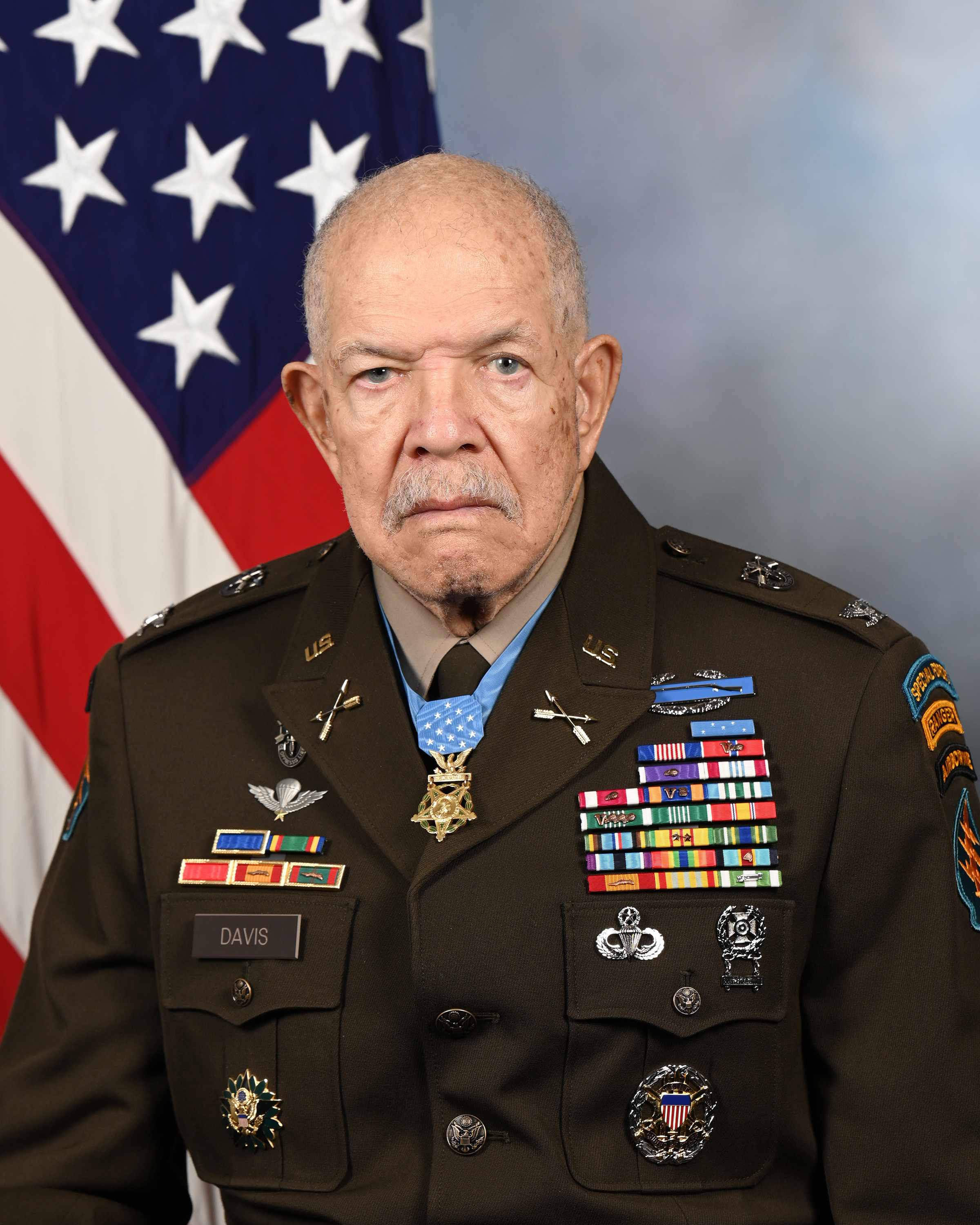
- Davis in 2023
- Born: 13 May 1939 (age 87); Cleveland, Ohio, U.S.
- Military career
- Allegiance: United States
- Branch: United States Army
- Service years: 1959–1985 (26 years)
- Rank: Colonel
- Commands: 10th Special Forces Group
- Conflicts: Vietnam War
- Awards: Medal of Honor; Soldier's Medal; Bronze Star Medal (2) with "V" device Purple Heart (2); Air Medal (2) with "V" device Army Commendation Medal (5) with "V" device
- Other work: Newspaper publisher

Paris D. Davis (born 13 May 1939) is a retired United States Army officer who received the Medal of Honor on 3 March 2023 for his actions on 18 June 1965 during the Vietnam War, while he was a captain with the 5th Special Forces Group. Originally awarded the Silver Star, Davis was twice previously nominated for the Medal of Honor, but both times the paperwork relating to his nomination disappeared; the time from the first nomination to the completion of a successful third nomination spanned 58 years.

Following his Medal of Honor action, Davis subsequently commanded the 10th Special Forces Group. He retired in 1985 as a full colonel after 26 years on active duty, and published the Metro Herald for another 30 years before fully retiring. He lives in Arlington County, Virginia.

== Early life ==
Davis studied political science at Southern University at Baton Rouge, Louisiana, on a Reserve Officers' Training Corps scholarship.

== Military career ==
Davis was commissioned as a Reserve Component officer on 1 June 1959, and earned Airborne and Ranger qualifications in 1960, and Special Forces qualification in 1962. His initial overseas tours included South Korea, South Vietnam (1962–1963) and Okinawa, Japan.

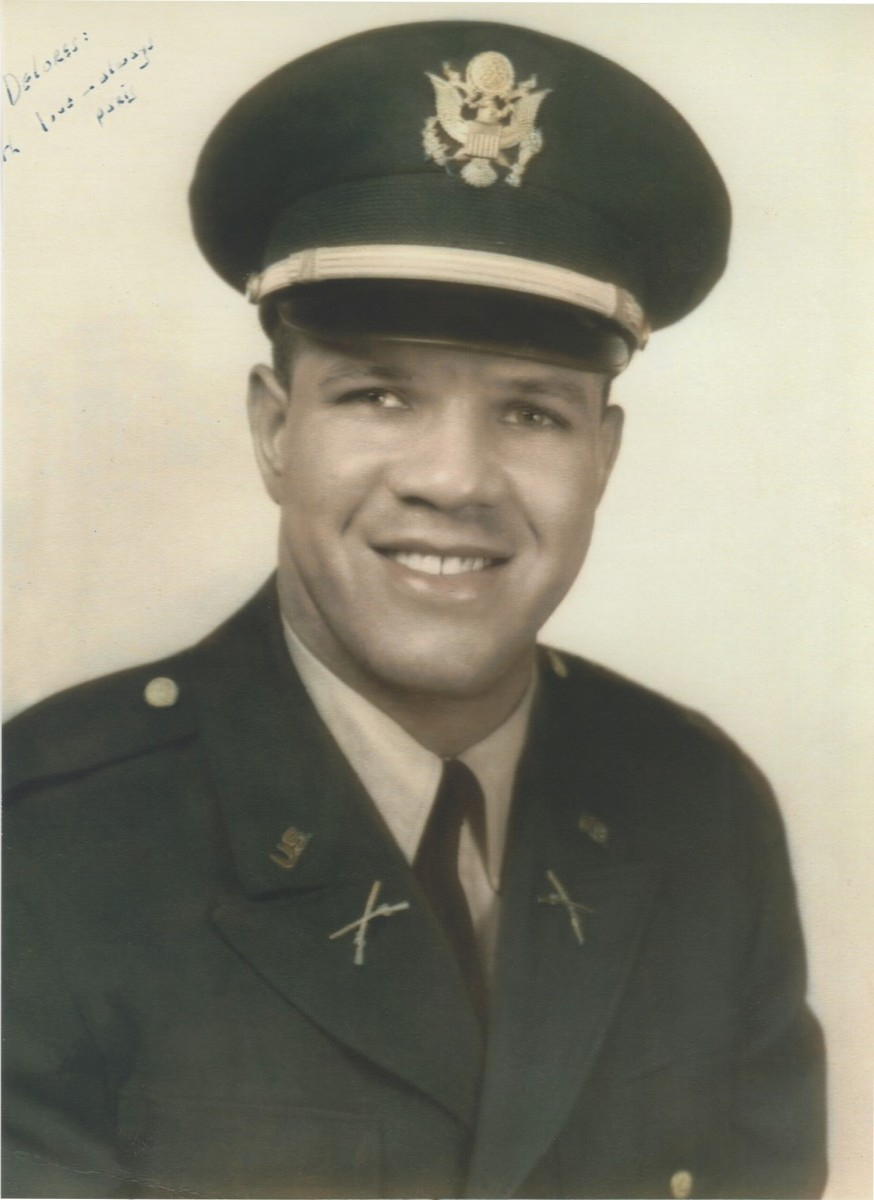
Davis as a captain in the 1960s

Davis arrived for his second tour in South Vietnam in April 1965 and took command of the 5th Special Forces Groups Team A-321 at Camp Bồng Sơn (14.417°N 109.003°E), Bình Định Province, II Corps.

On 18 June 1965, Davis and three of his Special Forces team led the Army of the Republic of Vietnam (ARVN) 883rd Regional Forces Company in an attack on a Viet Cong (VC) base. The following account was written by Davis:

We had just finished a successful raid on a Viet Cong Regimental Headquarters, killing upwards of one hundred of the enemy. The raid had started shortly after midnight. We had four Americans and the 883rd Vietnamese Regional Force Company participating in the raid. After the raid was completed the first platoon of the 883rd Company broke and started to run just about the same time I gave the signal to pull in the security guarding the river bank. I went after the lead platoon, MSG Billy Waugh was with the second platoon, SSG David Morgan was with the third platoon and SP-1 Brown was with the fourth platoon. It was just beginning to get light (dawn) when I caught up to the first platoon and got them organized and we were hit by automatic machine gun fire. It was up front and the main body of the platoon was hit by the machine gun. I was hit in the hand by a fragment from a hand grenade. About the time I started moving the platoon back to the main body, I heard firing and saw a wounded friendly VN soldier running from the direction of the firing. He told me that the remainder of the 883rd Company was under attack. I moved the platoon I had back towards the main body. When I reached the company, the enemy had it pinned down in an open field with automatic weapons and mortar fire.

I immediately ordered the platoon I had to return the fire, but they did not – only a few men fired. I started firing at the enemy moving up and down the line, encouraging the 883rd Company to return the fire. We started to receive fire from the right flank. I ran down to where the firing was and found five Viet Cong coming over the trench line. I killed all five and then I heard firing from the left flank. I ran down there and saw about six Viet Cong moving toward our position. I threw a grenade and killed four of them. My M16 jammed, so I shot one with my pistol and hit the other with my M16 again and again until he was dead.

MSG Waugh started to yell that he had been shot in the foot. I ran to the middle of the open field and tried to get MSG Waugh, but the Viet Cong automatic fire was too intense and I had to move back to safety. By this time SSG Morgan, who was at the edge of the open field, came to. He had been knocked out by a VC mortar round. He told me that he was receiving sniper fire. I spotted the sniper and shot him in his camouflaged manhole. I crawled over and dropped a grenade in the hole killing two additional Viet Cong.

I was able at this time to make contact with the FAC CPT Bronson and SGT Ronald Dies. CPT Bronson diverted a flight of 105's and had them drop their bombs on the enemy's position. I ran out and pulled SSG Morgan to safety. He was slightly wounded and I treated him for shock. The enemy again tried to overrun our position. I picked up a machine gun and started firing. I saw four or five of the enemy drop and the remaining ones break and run. I then set up the 60mm mortar, dropped about five or six mortars down the tube and ran out and tried to get MSG Waugh. SSG Morgan was partially recovered and placing machine gun fire into the enemy position. I ran out and tried to pick up MSG Waugh, who had by now been wounded four times in his right foot. I tried to pick him up, but I was unable to do so. I was shot slightly in the back of my leg as I ran for cover. By this time CPT Bronson had gotten a flight of F-4s. They started to drop bombs on the enemy. I ran out again and this time was shot in the wrist, but I was able to pick up MSG Waugh and carried him fireman style, in a hail of automatic weapon fire, to safety. I called for a MEDEVAC for MSG Waugh. When the MEDEVAC came I carried MSG Waugh about 200 yards (180 m) up over a hill. As I put MSG Waugh on the helicopter, SFC Reinburg got off the ship and ran down to where the 883rd Company was located. He was shot through the chest almost immediately. I ran to where he was and gave him first aid. With SSG Morgan's help I pulled him to safety.

The enemy again tried to overrun our position. I picked up the nearest weapon and started to fire. I was also throwing grenades. I killed about six or seven. I was then ordered to take the troops I had and leave. I informed the Colonel in the C&C ship that I had one wounded American and one American I didn't know the status of. I informed the Colonel that I would not leave until I got all the Americans out. SFC Reinburg was MEDEVACed out. The fighting continued until mid-afternoon. We could not get the Company we had to fight. The enemy tried to overrun our position two more times. We finally got reinforcements and with them I was able to go out and get SP-1 Brown who lay out in the middle of the field some fourteen hours from the start until the close of the battle.

Davis received the Silver Star and the Purple Heart for his efforts in this action.

The Bồng Sơn area remained a VC stronghold and U.S., ARVN and South Korean forces would mount Operation Masher there from 24 January to 6 March 1966.

Davis served a third tour in Vietnam in 1969, and later commanded the 10th Special Forces Group and retired from the army as a colonel in 1985.

=== Medal of Honor nomination ===
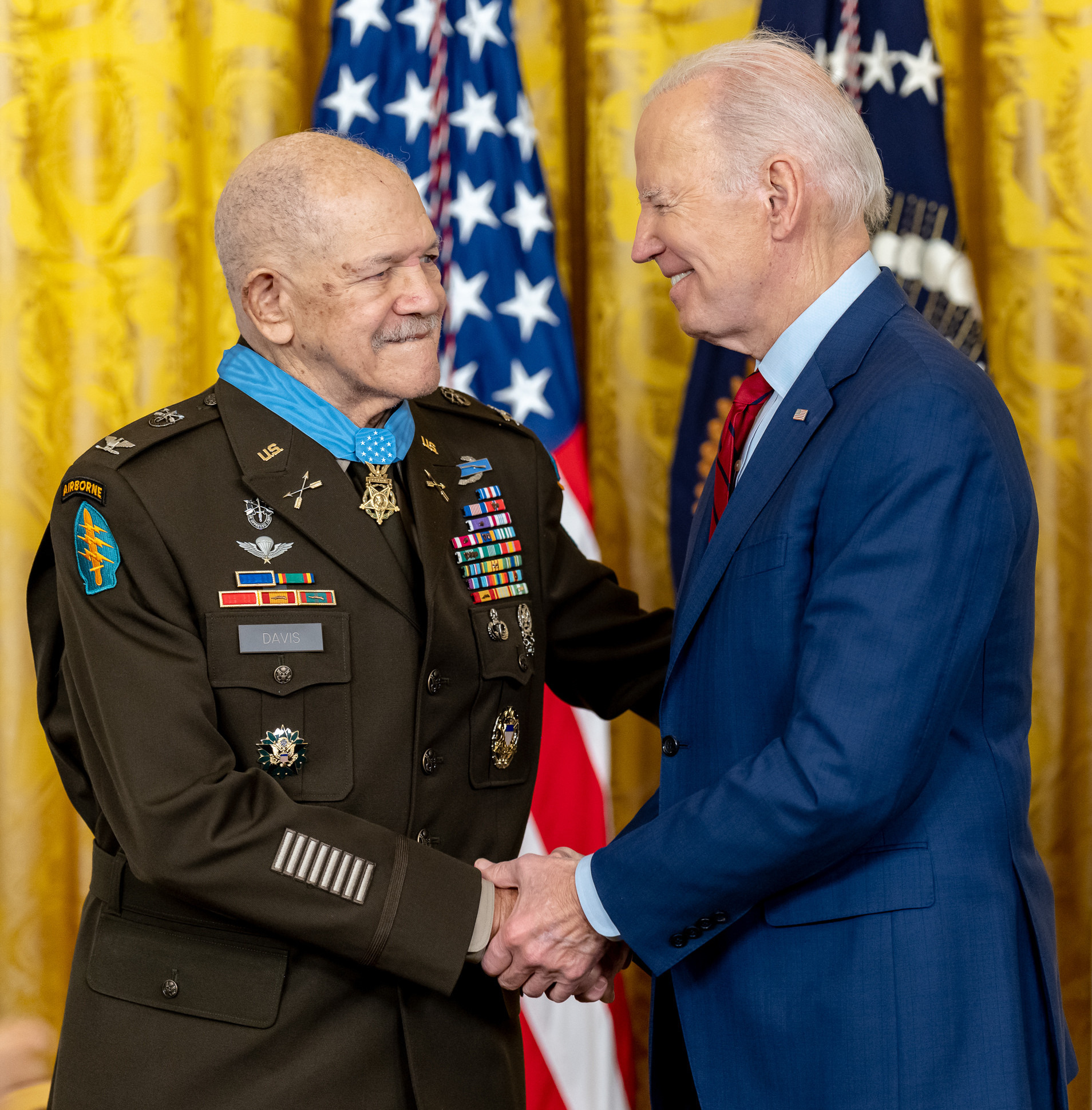
President Joe Biden presents retired Army Col. Paris D. Davis with the Medal of Honor

Davis was nominated for the Medal of Honor in 1965; however, the Army lost the nomination. In 1969 an inquiry was ordered and it found no record of the original nomination. The nomination was resubmitted and lost again. It has been suggested that racism was a factor, given that Davis is African-American.

In January 2021 then-Acting Secretary of Defense Christopher C. Miller ordered an expedited review of the lost nomination, to be completed by March 2021. In a June 2021 editorial Miller wrote that the military bureaucracy was again stalling the review and urged President Joe Biden to award Davis the Medal of Honor. In November 2022 it was reported that the nomination had been approved by Chairman of the Joint Chiefs of Staff, General Mark Milley, and was awaiting approval by Secretary of Defense Lloyd Austin. On 14 February 2023, it was confirmed that Davis would finally receive the Medal of Honor.

On 3 March 2023, Davis finally received the Medal of Honor 58 years after he was first nominated for it, the third nomination having the direct support and involvement of two different Secretaries of Defense, the Chairman of the Joint Chiefs of Staff, and the President of the United States. In accordance with custom for presenting the Medal of Honor, President Joe Biden presented the Medal of Honor to Davis personally in a ceremony at the White House.

== Later life ==
Davis published the Metro Herald newspaper in Virginia for 30 years. He is now retired and lives in Arlington County, Virginia.

In 2019 Davis was inducted into the U.S. Army Ranger Hall of Fame.

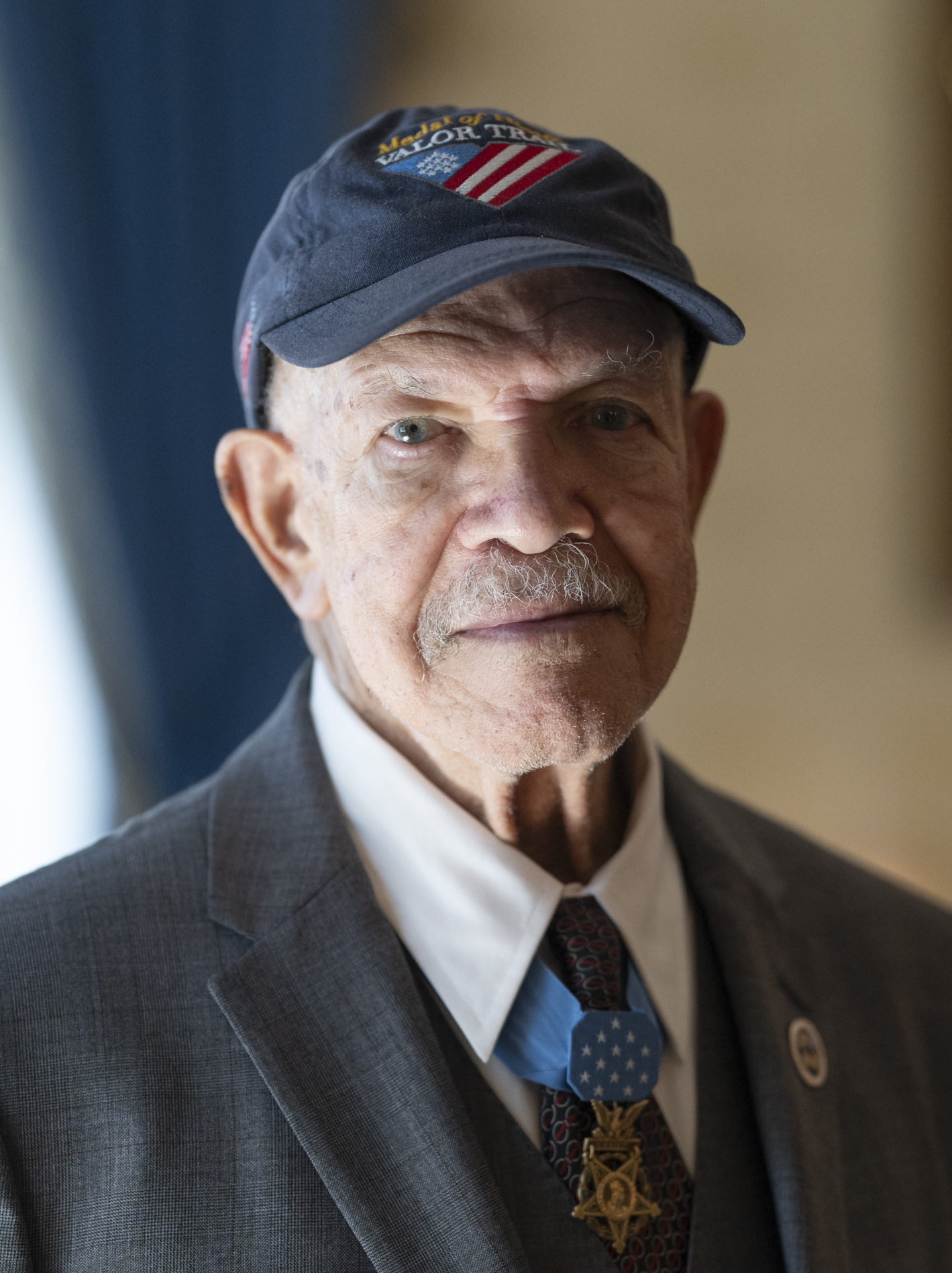
Paris Davis in 2025

At Fort Belvoir, Virginia on 13 SEP 2024, Military Intelligence Corps Association (MICA) Potomac Chapter members received Davis as their special guest. As coordinated by leadership with MICA National HQ, Colonel Charles Atkins, Ft. Huachuca, and MICA Potomac Chapter President, Major General Gregg C. Potter presented the Knowlton Award to Colonel Davis. The Knowlton Award was awarded to Davis, himself a highly decorated Army Ranger and Special Forces Officer, for “epitomiz[ing] the individual professionalism, bravery, patriotism, distinguished service and exemplary dedication to duty and country” upon which the Knowlton Award is based. The Knowlton Award recognizes the exceptional service of MI Corps hero Lieutenant Thomas Knowlton, commander of the first US Army unit dedicated to hazardous Intelligence and Reconnaissance functions – the Continental Army’s Knowlton’s Rangers.

On 14 June 2025 Davis, along with five other Medal of Honor recipients, participated in military, White House and Congressional Medal of Honor Society events commemorating the 250th anniversary of the U.S. Army and Flag Day.

On 17 June 2025 an autobiography of Davis was published by St. Martin's Press. The book is titled "Every Weapon I Had: A Vietnam Vet's Long Road to the Medal of Honor." By Paris Davis with Theo Emery. It covers the author's early life, joining the US Army, volunteering for Airborne training and Special Forces qualification, his deployments to the Republic of Vietnam, and his experiences following the war, up to the moment he was awarded the Medal of Honor in 2023.

== Medal of Honor Citation ==
On 1 March 2023 it was announced that President Joe Biden would present the Medal of Honor to Davis on 3 March 2023 in a ceremony at the White House.

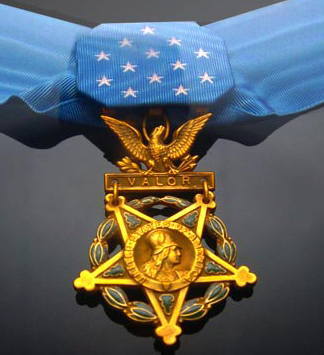

The President of the United States of America, authorized by Act of Congress March 3rd, 1863, has awarded in the name of Congress the Medal of Honor to Captain Paris D. Davis, United States Army, for conspicuous gallantry and intrepidity at the risk of his own life above and beyond the call of duty.

Captain Paris D. Davis, Commander, Detachment A-321, 5th Special Forces Group (Airborne), 1st Special Forces, distinguished himself by acts of gallantry and intrepidity above and beyond the call of duty while serving as an advisor to the 883rd Regional Force Company, Army of the Republic of Vietnam, during combat operations against an armed enemy in the vicinity of Bồng Sơn, Republic of Vietnam on June 17th through 18th, 1965.

Captain Davis and three other U.S. Special Forces advisors accompanied the Vietnamese 883rd Regional Force Company on its first combat mission, a daring nighttime raid against a Viet Cong regional headquarters housing a superior enemy force.

Captain Davis’s advice and leadership allowed the company to gain the tactical advantage, allowing it to surprise the unsuspecting enemy force and kill approximately 100 enemy soldiers. While returning from the successful raid, the regional force company was ambushed and sustained several casualties.

Captain Davis consistently exposed himself to the hostile armed — small arms fire to rally the inexperienced and disorganized company. He expertly directed both artillery and small arms fire, enabling other elements of the company to reach his position.

Although wounded in the leg, he aided in the evacuation of other wounded men in his unit, but refused medical evacuation himself. Following the arrival of air support, Captain Davis directed artillery fire within 30 meters of his own position in an attempt to halt the enemy’s advance.

Then, with complete disregard for his own life, he braved intense enemy fire to cross an open field to rescue his seriously wounded and immobilized team sergeant. While carrying the sergeant up the hill to a position of relative safety, Captain Davis was again wounded by enemy fire.

Despite two painful wounds, Captain Davis again refused medical evacuation, remained with the troops, fought bravely, and provided pivotal leadership and inspiration to the regional force company as they repelled several Viet Cong assaults on their position over a period of several hours.

When friendly reinforcements finally arrived, Captain Davis again refused medical evacuation until he had recovered a U.S. advisor under his command who had been wounded during the initial ambush and presumed dead.

While personally recovering the wounded soldier, he found him severely wounded but still clinging to life. Captain Davis directed the helicopter extraction of his wounded colleague not leaving the battlefield himself until after all friendly forces were recovered or medically evacuated.

Captain Davis’s heroism and selflessness above and beyond the call of duty, at the risk of his own life, are in keeping with the highest traditions of military service and reflect great credit upon himself, his unit, and the United States Army.

== Honors and awards ==
Davis' personal decorations include:

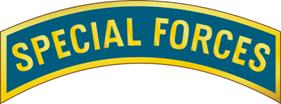
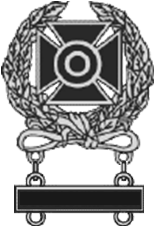

Special Forces Distinctive Unit Insignia

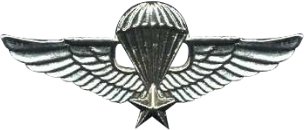

8 Overseas Service Bars

Combat Infantryman Badge
Medal of Honor (upgraded on 3 March 2023 from a Silver Star awarded 15 December 1965)		Soldier's Medal for Heroism 16 December 1968
Bronze Star Medal with "V" device and 1 bronze oak leaf cluster 13 April 1966	Purple Heart with 1 bronze oak leaf cluster	Defense Meritorious Service Medal
Meritorious Service Medal with 1 bronze oak leaf cluster	Air Medal with "V" device & award numerals 2 25 November 1969	Joint Service Commendation Medal
Army Commendation Medal with "V" device and 3 oak leaf clusters 29 May 1968	Army Commendation Medal	National Defense Service Medal
Armed Forces Expeditionary Medal	Vietnam Service Medal with 3 service stars	Korea Defense Service Medal
Humanitarian Service Medal	Army Service Ribbon	Army Overseas Service Ribbon with bronze star
Republic of Vietnam Gallantry Cross with Palm 15 May 1968, Gold Star 16 May 1965, Silver Star 29 May 1965, and Bronze Star 16 June 1965	Republic of Vietnam Armed Forces Honor Medal First Class 15 May 1968	Vietnam Campaign Medal
Special Forces Tab	Ranger Tab	AirborneUS Army Special Forces Combat Service Identification Badge
Master Parachutist Badge		Expert Marksmanship badge with rifle component bar
Joint Chiefs of Staff Identification Badge
Special Forces Distinctive Unit Insignia
Republic of Vietnam Master Parachute Badge
Presidential Unit Citation		Navy Unit Commendation
Meritorious Unit Commendation	Republic of Vietnam Gallantry Cross Unit Citation	Republic of Vietnam Civil Actions Medal Unit Citation
Army Staff Identification Badge
8 Overseas Service Bars

== See also ==
- List of Medal of Honor recipients for the Vietnam War
