= Gene Graham =

American journalist and educator

Gene Swann Graham
- Born: August 26, 1924; Murray, Kentucky
- Died: May 24, 1982 (aged 57)
- Education: Murray State College (B.S.)
- Occupation: Journalist
- Spouse: Martha Fentress (m. 1945)
- Children: Susan Marie, Betty Jane, and Philip Gene
- Writing career
- Notable awards: Pulitzer Prize for National Reporting; 1962

Gene Swann Graham (August 26, 1924 – May 24, 1982) was an American journalist and educator who was associated for many years with the Nashville Tennessean and with the University of Illinois at Urbana–Champaign. He was a co-winner of the Pulitzer Prize for National Reporting in 1962.

John Seigenthaler, former publisher of the Tennessean and a founding editorial director of USA Today, described Graham as "a multi-talented journalist, a first rate reporter, a wonderful cartoonist believe it or not, and also a fine editorialist." David Halberstam, a fellow Pulitzer Prize winner and veteran of the Tennessean, called Graham a "great reporter."

== Early life and education ==
Graham was born in Murray, Kentucky. His parents were Carmon McWade Graham and Opal (Swann) Graham. After serving as a pilot in the U.S. Navy from 1943 to 1945, he attended Murray State College, from which he received a B.S. degree in 1948.

== Career ==
=== Journalism ===
After graduating from Murray State, Graham went to work at the Nashville Tennessean, where he reported on city, county, state, and federal government news from 1948 to 1964. He also contributed editorial cartoons, some of which are now in the special collections of the University of Tennessee.

He covered a trial that "marked the first time since Tennessee's Reconstruction that a white man had been found guilty and imprisoned for slaying an African American."

After John F. Kennedy's assassination, Graham wrote in tribute: "He could never hide his humor.... He struggled for a dead pan but couldn't hold it; the devilish twinkle of his eye and the quirk of a mouth tempted to grin betrayed his forthcoming quips…[Now] the devilish eye, the betraying quirk of the mouth are gone. And nothing is funny about their departure."

=== Academia ===
He was a visiting lecturer at the University of Illinois at Urbana-Champaign from 1964 to 1965, an associate professor of journalism at the same institution from 1965 to 1971, and a full professor there from 1972 to 1975. Gene Gilmore, a colleague of Graham's at Urbana-Champaign, described Graham as "very popular with the students" there and said that Graham had been "awarded instructor of the year honors more than once while there, recognition of his unique ability to relate to his students."

From 1966 to 1970, he was also a training consultant at The Boston Globe. In 1969–70, he was a seminar leader at the American Press Institute at Columbia University and a communications consultant for Middle Tennessee State University, traveling around central Tennessee in an effort to determine whether there as a need for a mass-communications program at Middle Tennessee State University. He concluded that there was such a need, and the program was established.

He retired because of a "struggle with cancer and brain tumors."

=== Politics ===
He served as press aide to the campaign of U.S. Senator Al Gore in 1969.

=== Books ===
His book One Man, One Vote: Baker v. Carr and the American Levellers was published by Little, Brown in 1972. It tells the story of the Supreme Court ruling that affirmed the principle of one-man-one-vote, which, in Graham's view, was "among the most important developments in the world's history of egalitarian ideas." Kirkus Reviews praised Graham's discussion of "people and politics" and his "delineation of the substantive legal issues," and called it "an informative, stimulating book."

=== Other professional activities ===
On October 11, 1968, he spoke at the University of Illinois at Urbana-Champaign about media coverage during wartime. He attributed what he called "the age of demonstration" to the emotional impact of television news, which he criticized "because facts are often distorted for entertainment value."

== Honors and awards ==
In 1962, Graham and a colleague at the Tennessean, Nathan G. Caldwell, shared the Pulitzer Prize for National Reporting for "their exclusive disclosure and six years of detailed reporting, under great difficulties, of the undercover cooperation between management interests in the coal industry and the United Mine Workers." They had worked together for six years on the story, and "exposed a sweetheart deal between John L. Lewis, president of the United Mine Workers, and Cyrus Eaton, the billionaire financier who had major interests in the coal fields." Their articles, published under both journalists' bylines, "exposed how the deal robbed mine workers, many suffering from black lung disease, of their hospitalization," and led to a federal investigation and to lawsuits in which the union was found guilty of violating anti-trust laws.

Graham was a Nieman Fellow at Harvard University in 1962–63.

He was presented with Murray State's Distinguished Alumni Award in 1962. He was the first person to receive the award, which is still given annually.

== Legacy ==
Middle Tennessee State University awards the Gene Graham Journalism Award to junior journalism majors.

== Personal life ==
Graham married Martha Fentress in 1945. They had three children, Susan Marie, Betty Jane, and Philip Gene. He was a member of the Disciples of Christ.
