= Kocher criteria =

The Kocher criteria are a tool useful in the differentiation of septic arthritis from transient synovitis in the child with a painful hip. They are named for Mininder S. Kocher, an orthopaedic surgeon at Boston Children's Hospital and Professor of Orthopaedic Surgery at Harvard Medical School.

The original study used retrospective pediatric cases to develop the criteria over multiple years. The score is primarily used in orthopedic cases in which the symptoms experienced in septic arthritis and transient synovitis are similar. The criteria can be used on multiple joints — the hip being the most tested given its frequency of diagnosis and importance to the patient's mobility. The knee and the ankle can also experience these symptoms and the criteria can be applied to symptomatic joints such as these. Septic arthritis is an orthopedic emergency, which, if treatment is delayed, can lead to irreversible joint damage. Septic arthritis occurs more often in childhood than at any other time. Kocher criteria are a useful guide to the diagnosis of septic arthritis in children, especially in the hip, one of the most frequently affected joints. However, the attending physician is requested to put these criteria into clinical context. For example, the attending physician has to use his own clinical judgement and experience to rule out the presence of concurrent acute hematogenous osteomyelitis in cases of proven septic arthritis. Further, children with septic arthritis - of hip - are highly unlikely to be able to weight bear freely. Contrastingly, children with transient synovitis of the hip can occasionally.

== Scoring ==
A point is given for each of the four following criteria:

- Non-weight-bearing on affected side
- Erythrocyte sedimentation rate > 40
- Fever > 38.5 °C
- White blood cell count > 12,000

| Score | Likelihood of septic arthritis |
|---|---|
| 1 | 3% |
| 2 | 40% |
| 3 | 93% |
| 4 | 99% |
