= Nat Caldwell =

American journalist

- Born: Nathan Green Caldwell; April 16, 1912; St. Charles, Missouri
- Died: February 11, 1985 (aged 72); Gallatin, Tennessee
- Education: Southwestern at Memphis; Cumberland University
- Occupation: Journalist
- Spouse: Camilla Frances Johnson (m. 1936; d. 1985)
- Writing career
- Notable awards: Pulitzer Prize for National Reporting; 1962

Nathan Green Caldwell (July 16, 1912 – February 11, 1985) was an American journalist who spent fifty years on the staff of the Nashville Tennessean. He was a co-winner of the Pulitzer Prize for National Reporting in 1962.

== Early life and education ==
Born in St. Charles, Missouri, Caldwell was the son of Albert Green Caldwell, a mechanical engineer, and Sara (Jetton) Caldwell, both Tennessee natives. One of his grandfathers (apparently Wailer C. Caldwell) was a Tennessee Supreme Court justice.

He grew up in Lakeland, Florida. After his father died, Caldwell, at the age of ten, went to work on the Lakeland Evening Ledger as a solicitor of circulation. While still a child and in his early teens, according to a 1979 interview, he sold "hair straighteners, a line of cosmetics to blacks, delivered newspapers and sold newspapers as a street salesman." In addition, he worked nights as a masseur.

At about age 14 he formed a small "citrus fruit tree trimming, spraying, fertilizing service" that employed "about eighteen kids." He saved enough money to pay his first year through college, and returned to Tennessee to do so in 1930, but five banks "busted right out from under me" before he could go to school. His mother managed to arrange "a grant or scholarship or something as a potential ministerial student" so he could start as a freshman at Southwestern at Memphis. His freshman English teacher was Robert Penn Warren. While studying there, he worked in circulation on the Memphis Press-Scimitar and Memphis Commercial Appeal.

In 1931, after a year at Southwestern, he went to Trenton, Tennessee, where he worked on the Trenton Herald Democrat. He then attended Cumberland University Law School in Lebanon, Tennessee, where two of his great grandfathers "had been very successful lawyers and politicians and law teachers." One of them was Nathan Green Sr., who was a founder of the law school. Green's son, Caldwell's maternal grandfather, was Nathan Green Jr., a law professor there.

== Career ==
He joined the Nashville Tennessean in 1934; his first assignment at the Tennessean "covering the new alphabet agencies" formed by FDR. At the paper, he worked in turn as a general assignment, political, labor relations, and regional economics reporter. "His work included investigative reporting, environmental reporting, political correspondence, feature writing and editorial writing." In his later years, Caldwell "was a mentor to many young members of the staff." An expert on the Tennessee Valley Authority, he covered the agency for 20 years.

In 1940, he spent a year at Harvard University, where he studied labor relations, utility organization, and civic management on a Nieman Fellowship.

He served in the U.S. Navy during World War II. After the war he "stayed in as an enlisted [man] for another six months" so he could go to Siberia. He also went to Shanghai.

During his years at The Tennessean, he "exposed labor-management corruption, strip mining abuses, nursing home maltreatment of the elderly, civil rights violations and government corruption at the federal, state and local levels." Caldwell "was known across the region of the Tennessee Valley as a journalist whose stories often reflected a positive tone. He was a crusading reporter, for example, on behalf of public power and community development." A former Tennessee Valley Authority chairman said, "Nat Caldwell is responsible for more TVA and Corps of Engineers dams and lakes than any member of Congress."

For a 1968 series on nursing home care, Caldwell had himself admitted into one such home in Nashville. "Nashvillians who plan to send an elderly relative to one of this city's 26 nursing homes," he wrote at the beginning of the first article, "should be aware that they may be committing their loved one to a crowded, unsanitary, ignored existence." One nursing home owner told colleagues of Caldwell's, posing as his niece and nephew "You got to conquer an old man like that." Caldwell wrote, "I have been called a hard-boiled reporter. Often. In those three weeks, I cried. And not at anything that happened to me." The six-week investigation by him and other reporters involved all 26 private nursing homes in Nashville.

In 1976, after Caldwell wrote an article challenging Mississippi businessman James F. Hooper III's qualifications to serve on the TVA board, Hooper sued Caldwell, along with the Tennessean, East Tennessee Research Corp., and two of that firm's employees, for over $2.4 million in a libel suit.

On one occasion, The Tennessean "had to provide police protection when a series of articles resulted in his being physically assaulted." Another time, "the newspaper was sued for $1 million by a nominee for the TVA Board after a U.S. Senate Committee recited Caldwell's news stories as grounds for refusing to confirm the nomination."

In 1949, he spent several months in the Middle East. He studied Tennessee Valley Authority-style development in Israel and Arab nations, interviewed officials in several Middle Eastern cities, and noted the Iraqi consulate's refusal to give him a visa to visit Baghdad in the company of a United Nations mission on refugees. According to the Tennessee Newspaper Hall of Fame, the feature story that resulted "resonates more than 50 years later and provided a portrait of conflicts to come."

Caldwell himself described a series of eight articles about "the migration of millions of black and poor white people out of the South as a consequence of the anticipated mechanization of Southern agriculture" as his "most significant" project. For this story, Charles S. Johnson, president of Fisk University, chartered a small plane for six weeks in which Caldwell traveled around the country interviewing "black families who left Southern farms and migrated to military defense plants during World War II." His series was reprinted in twenty-eight newspapers, including the London Times, the New York Herald Tribune, and the Chicago Sun-Times, with magazines like Newsweek and The Atlantic Monthly summing up his conclusions.

== Honors and awards ==
In 1946 he won a Rosenwald Fellowship for a study of the migration of African Americans out of the South.

In 1962, Caldwell and a colleague at the Tennessean, Gene S. Graham, shared the Pulitzer Prize for National Reporting for "their exclusive disclosure and six years of detailed reporting, under great difficulties, of the undercover cooperation between management interests in the coal industry and the United Mine Workers." They had worked together for six years on the story, and "exposed a sweetheart deal between John L. Lewis, president of the United Mine Workers, and Cyrus Eaton, the billionaire financier who had major interests in the coal fields." Their articles, published under both journalists' bylines, "exposed how the deal robbed mine workers, many suffering from black lung disease, of their hospitalization," and led to a federal investigation and to lawsuits in which the union was found guilty of violating anti-trust laws. From the beginning, Lewis called Caldwell and Graham liars, and according to Caldwell, the New York Times investigated him to determine whether this was the case.

He was inducted into the Tennessee Newspaper Hall of Fame in 2003.

== Personal life and views ==
He married Camilla Frances Johnson (perhaps spelled Jonson) in 1936. They had one son, John Sam, who went to Harvard.

"I wound up with a bad taste for the morals of capitalism that remained in my life ever since," he said in 1979, identifying himself as a socialist. He explained that the "privations" he endured in his youth taught him that "you had to save money" and "invest it." As a result, he said, "when I get ready to cash out my chips I will leave a much larger estate than most people leave who go to work for the New York Times."

== Death ==
Caldwell died when his car went off a bridge into a lake near his home in Gallatin, Tennessee, on February 11, 1985. Jack Amos, of Hendersonville, Tennessee, attempted to save Nat after seeing his car go off the bridge. Jack almost died in the attempt. Although he was unable to save Nat due to the freezing weather conditions of the lake, Jack was honored by the Mayor of Nashville for his bravery.

== Legacy ==
There is a Nat Caldwell Park in Gallatin, Tennessee.
