= The Tennessean =

Daily newspaper in Nashville, Tennessee

- July 27, 2005 front page of The Tennessean
- Type: Daily newspaper
- Format: Broadsheet
- Owner: USA Today Co.
- Editor: Benjamin Goad
- Founded: May 12, 1907; 119 years ago (as The Nashville Tennessean)
- Headquarters: 1801 West End Ave; Nashville, Tennessee 37203; United States
- Circulation: 21,559 daily; 31,863 Sunday; (as of 2022)
- ISSN: 1053-6590
- OCLC number: 6431386
- Website: www.tennessean.com

The Tennessean (known until 1972 as The Nashville Tennessean) is a daily newspaper in Nashville, Tennessee. Its circulation area covers 39 counties in Middle Tennessee and eight counties in southern Kentucky. It is owned by USA Today Co., which also owns several smaller community newspapers in Middle Tennessee, including The Dickson Herald, the Gallatin News-Examiner, the Hendersonville Star-News, the Fairview Observer, and the Ashland City Times. Its circulation area overlaps those of the Clarksville Leaf-Chronicle and The Daily News Journal in Murfreesboro, two other independent USA Today Co. owned papers. The company publishes several specialty publications, including Nashville Lifestyles magazine.

== History ==
The Tennessean, Nashville's daily newspaper, traces its roots back to the Nashville Whig, a weekly paper that began publication on September 1, 1812. The paper underwent various mergers and acquisitions throughout the 19th century, emerging as the Nashville American.

The first issue of the Nashville Tennessean was printed on Sunday May 12, 1907. The paper was founded by Col. Luke Lea, a 28-year-old attorney and local political activist.

In 1910, the publishers purchased a controlling interest in the Nashville American. They began publishing an edition known as The Tennessean American. When the American formally folded in 1911, some of its employees banded together to found the Nashville Democrat. This paper was purchased by the Tennessean in 1913.

In 1931, Col. Luke Lea and his son Luke Lea, Jr. were indicted for their role in the failure of the Central Bank and Trust Co. of Asheville, North Carolina. On March 3, 1933, the newspaper was placed under federal receivership, and Ashland City attorney and former Tennessean editorial writer Littleton J. Pardue was appointed to direct the paper. Under his leadership circulation grew swiftly, but the newspaper continued to lose money.

In 1935, the Reconstruction Finance Corporation acquired a large portion of the paper's outstanding bonds. It eventually sold them to Paul Davis, president of the First American National Bank of Nashville.

Still suffering from effects of the Great Depression, the paper was sold at auction in 1937, when it was purchased for $850,000 by Silliman Evans, Sr. a former reporter for the Fort Worth Star-Telegram. Evans came to an agreement with Nashville Banner publisher James Stahlman to move both newspapers into new offices at 1100 Broadway. He created the Newspaper Printing Corporation as a business agent for both papers. As part of this agreement, the Tennessean ceased publication of its evening editions, and the Banner ceased publication of its Sunday edition. The two newspapers maintained a joint operating agreement from 1937 until the Banner ceased publication February 20, 1998. The two papers operated out of the same building and shared advertising and production staff, but maintained separate (and distinct) ownership and editorial voices.

On June 2, 1955, Silliman Evans Jr. was named president of the paper. After his father died unexpectedly of a heart attack on June 26, the board of the paper elected him publisher, and he became president of the Newspaper Printing Corporation in August.

In 1957, Tennessean cartoonist Tom Little won a Pulitzer Prize for his cartoon, "Wonder Why My Parents Didn't Give Me Salk Shots?", encouraging parents to have their children immunized against polio.

In 1961, Silliman Evans Jr. died of a heart attack at age 36 while on his boat on Old Hickory Lake. Ownership of the newspaper passed to his mother, and several months later his brother Amon Carter Evans was named Chief Executive of the paper.

Tennessean reporters Nat Caldwell and Gene Graham won a Pulitzer Prize in 1962 "[f]or their exclusive disclosure and six years of detailed reporting, under great difficulties, of the undercover cooperation between management interests in the coal industry and the United Mine Workers." In the same year, John Seigenthaler Sr. was named editor of the newspaper. He would earn the additional title of publisher in 1973.

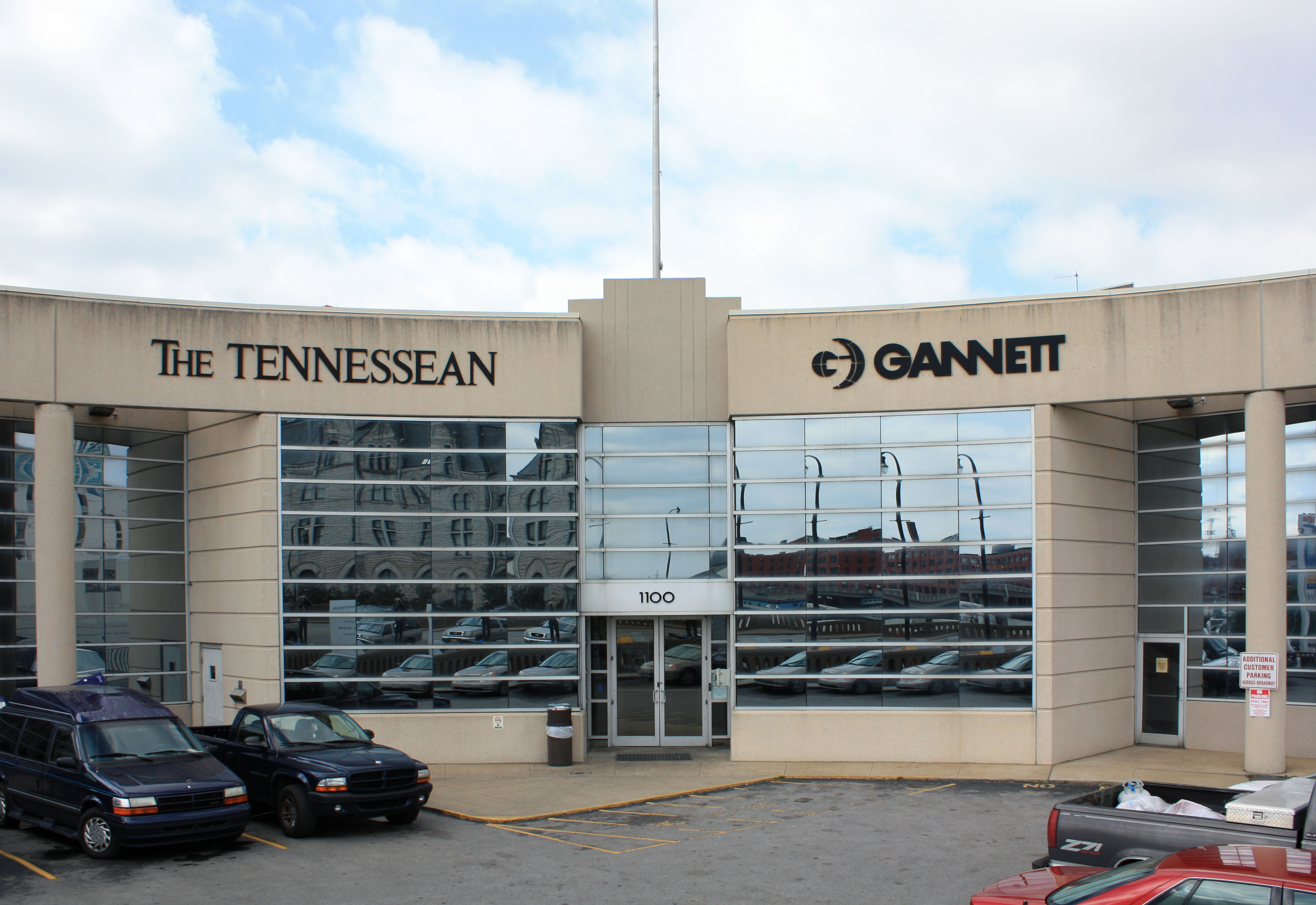
Offices for The Tennessean. The Gannett logo replaced the Nashville Banner logo in 1998.

In 1972, the Gannett Corporation purchased the Nashville Banner from the Stahlman family. In 1979, Gannett sold the Banner to a group of local investors including political figure John Jay Hooker, businessman Brownlee Currey and Franklin banker Irby Simpkins for about $25 million. It then purchased the Tennessean from the Evans family for about $50 million. John Seigenthaler became president, publisher, and editor of the Gannett-owned Tennessean. Historian E. Thomas Wood says that "without question" Seigenthaler ran the newspaper as a liberal one.

In 1976, when it was revealed that Tennessean reporter Jacqueline Srouji had for many years been working as an informant (and possibly agent provocateur) for the FBI, including spying on her colleagues at the paper, Seigenthaler fired her immediately. Srouji claimed that when she had started as a reporter for the Nashville Banner over a decade before, that paper's publisher had encouraged her to hand over information to the FBI.

In 1989, Frank Sutherland was named editor. He had begun his career as a reporter at the paper in 1963. Seigenthaler retired as publisher in 1991. He was replaced by Craig Moon, who held the post until he moved into a corporate position with Gannett in 2002; Moon was later named publisher of USA Today. Leslie Giallombardo was publisher from 2002 to 2005. Seigenthaler remained "Chairman Emeritus" until he died.

In September 1998, the paper launched Tennessean.com, its news and information website.

Among the notable journalists who have worked for The Tennessean are Vice President Al Gore and his wife Tipper, Pulitzer Prize winning author David Halberstam, New York Times best-selling author Jeff Pearlman, long-time sports columnist Larry Woody and cartoonist Anthony Wright.

The paper's primary print competitors are the weekly Nashville Scene and the Nashville Business Journal. In 2004 Gannett announced the acquisition of the Franklin Review-Appeal, and The Daily News Journal in Murfreesboro from Morris Multimedia. The Review-Appeal became a supplement of The Tennessean, while the Daily News Journal continued to operate as an independent newspaper.

The paper maintains two Goss Colorliner presses. In 2002, the paper completed installation of a MAN Roland UNISET press, which is now used to print regional editions of USA Today, as well as commercial printing jobs. In early 2019 it was announced that the Tennessean would begin to be printed in Knoxville on presses which it would share with the Knoxville News-Sentinel.

John Seigenthaler joined The Tennessean in 1949, resigning in 1960 to act as Robert F. Kennedy's administrative assistant. He rejoined The Tennessean as editor in 1962, publisher in 1973, and chairman in 1982 before retiring as chairman emeritus in 1991.

Ellen Leifeld was named as publisher in September 2005, succeeding Leslie Giallombardo, who became the newspaper's first female publisher in April 2002. Carol Hudler was named publisher in 2009 when Leifeld retired. Hudler was replaced by Laura Hollingsworth, who was named president and publisher in May 2013.

Frank Sutherland served as editor of the newspaper from 1989–2004. He began his journalism career as a reporter at the paper in the 1960s and returned as editor after a serving in several leadership positions at other newspapers. He announced his retirement in September 2004. He was briefly succeeded by Everett J. Mitchell II, the former managing editor of the Detroit News, who was the first African American to be editor of The Tennessean. In September 2006, Mark Silverman was announced as editor. He was replaced by Maria De Varenne in 2011, who held the executive editor post until February 2014. At that time, Stefanie Murray was named vice president for content and engagement. She was previously an assistant managing editor at the Detroit Free Press.

In March 2013, The Tennessean's circulation was reported as 100,825 daily (M-F), 102,855 (Sat) and 227,626 (Sun). In contrast, as of November 2, 2005, the paper reported daily circulation of 177,714; Saturday circulation of 199,489 and Sunday circulation of 250,575.

In early 2019, The Tennessean confirmed that it would be leaving its long-time headquarters at 1100 Broadway for a smaller facility nearby, and that its printing operations would be consolidated with those of the Gannett-owned Knoxville News-Sentinel at a facility near Knoxville, resulting in much earlier deadlines for its print editions.

In 2022, The Tennessean moved to a six day printing schedule, eliminating its printed Saturday edition.

== See also ==
- List of newspapers in Tennessee
