= The Herald (Ireland) =

Tabloid newspaper published in Ireland

- Type: Daily newspaper
- Format: Tabloid (formerly broadsheet)
- Owner(s): Mediahuis Ireland, a subsidiary of Mediahuis
- Founded: 1891
- Language: English
- Headquarters: Talbot Street, Dublin
- ISSN: 0791-6906
- Website: herald.ie

The Herald is a nationwide mid-market tabloid newspaper headquartered in Dublin, Ireland, and published by Independent News & Media who are a subsidiary of Mediahuis. It is published Monday–Saturday. The newspaper was known as the Evening Herald until its name was changed in 2013. It is known for its vendors on the streets of Dublin.

== History ==
The Evening Herald was first published in Dublin on 19 December 1891. Former contributors included Joan Tighe.

In 1982 the paper changed its size from broadsheet to tabloid.

Until November 2000, the Evening Herald was produced and pressed in Independent House on Middle Abbey Street, Dublin 1. The monochrome printing facility in the basement of this building was then retired, and the paper is now printed in full colour at a purpose-built plant in Citywest, along with the Irish Independent, the Sunday Independent and various other regional newspapers owned by Independent News & Media. In 2004, production of the paper was moved from Independent House to a new office on Talbot Street and the paper's old home was sold to the neighbouring department store, Arnotts, for an estimated €26 million.

The life of Herald music critic Chris Wasser was threatened by fans of boy band The Wanted in 2012 following the publication of his review of their gig in Dublin.

In March 2013, it was reported that the Evening Herald was to be renamed The Herald and would become a morning rather than an evening newspaper.

In March 2017, it was announced that INM were merging the Sunday World and The Herald newsrooms.

In October 2020, Independent News & Media announced that they would not longer be supporting the Herald website and would merge the Herald newsroom with the INM newsroom.

In 2023, it was reported that Mediahuis were no longer investing in The Herald and it was being left to "sink or swim".

== Herald AM ==
On 10 October 2005, a free version of the Evening Herald, published in the mornings and entitled Herald AM, began distribution, as a defensive measure against the Daily Mail and General Trust-owned Metro, launched on the same date. It joined with another morning freesheet Metro to become the Metro Herald. Herald AM later closed.

== Circulation ==
Year (period)	Average circulation per issue
1999 (January to June)	110,500
2005 (January to June)	93,830
2006 (January to June)	87,645
2010 (January to June)	67,657
2011 (January to June)	61,936
2012 (January to June)	61,179
2012 (July to December)	58,826
2014 (July to December)	49,512
2015 (July to December)	44,317
2016 (January to June)	44,085
2016 (July to December)	40,847
2017 (January to June)	39,093
2017 (July to December)	36,097
2018 (January to June)	31,946
2018 (July to December)	28,940

In 2019, Independent News & Media exited the ABC auditing process. Hence, no circulation figures are available after 2018.
