= The Herald (Nigeria) =

Nigerian newspaper

- Website type: News, Entertainment, Politics
- Available in: English
- Founded: 1973; 53 years ago
- Headquarters: Kwara State, {{{location_country}}}
- Area served: Nigeria
- Website: www.theheraldnews.ng
- Launched: 1973
- Current status: Active
- Written in: HTML, CSS, JavaScript

The Herald is a Nigerian digital newspaper and magazine established by the Kwara State Government in 1973, ranked among the best-selling newspapers in the 1970s and 1980s.

== History ==
Established in 1973, The Herald has correspondents in Kaduna, Kano, Kogi and Abuja. Falilat Adetoun Olaoye and Clement Adeboye was appointed the general manager of The Herald and Yomi Adeboye as editor in 2020. The newspaper is state-owned. The Herald is published by Kwara State Printing and Publishing Corporation.

== Editors ==
- Adedoyin (former)
- Mahmoud (former)
- Falilat Adetoun Olaoye
- Yomi Adeboye
- John Ogunsemore (Senior Editor)

== Controversies ==
In 2019, the three state-owned media bodies including The Herald newspaper, Radio Kwara and Kwara Television Service faced operational difficulties due to financial challenges. The Herald staff conducted a peaceful protest over "poor working conditions".

In 2020, the Kwara state governor, AbdulRahman AbdulRazaq fired general managers of the three state-owned media bodies including The Herald newspaper, Radio Kwara and Kwara Television Service.
