= Henry Holsinger =

Brethren pastor and publisher

Henry Ritz Holsinger (26 May 1833 – 12 March 1905) was a progressive pastor, publisher and leader of The Brethren Church. He was instrumental to the church split of 1883.

He was baptized into the German Baptist Brethren Church in 1855, ordained as minister in 1866 and elevated to the office of bishop in 1880. In 1882, Henry Holsinger, who was the publisher of The Progressive Christian, was disfellowshipped from the Annual Meeting of the German Baptist Brethren. He and others organized The Brethren Church in 1883 at Dayton, Ohio, with about 6,000 members. The Progressive Christian was renamed The Brethren Evangelist and is still published bi-monthly by the church. Ashland College which had been founded in 1878, came under the control of the Brethren Church.

== Works ==
- History of the Tunkers and the Brethren Church, Oakland, CA 1901.
