= Herald AM =

Herald am
- Type: Daily morning newspaper
- Format: Tabloid
- Owner: Independent News & Media
- Founded: 2005
- Ceased publication: 2010
- Political alignment: Populist on social issues
- Headquarters: Talbot Street, Dublin
- Website: www.herald.ie

The Herald AM was a free daily newspaper in Dublin which was published between 2005 and 2010. It was distributed at train stations, bus stops, Luas stations, traffic junctions, and high density footpaths, and was one of two free newspapers distributed to Dublin commuters. It was owned by Independent News & Media, and had a daily readership of around 120,000 and a circulation of around 72,000 copies daily. It merged with the competing publication Metro Ireland to form the Metro Herald in 2010.

== History ==
The Herald AM was founded in September 2005 by Independent News & Media. It was launched as a response to the introduction of the Associated Newspapers- and Metro International-owned Metro newspaper. The Metro was at the time owned in part by the British Daily Mail and carried stories and editorial from the London edition of its sister Metro paper.

The Herald AM newspaper was originally intended to be called Herald Metro. However, legal action from Metro International led to it being renamed Herald AM prior to launch. The newspaper also initially carried the words "metro edition" as part of its masthead, but dropped this tag during a redesign in April 2006.

The Metro and Herald AM merged in 2010 to form the Metro Herald.

== Content ==
The paper's news content was aimed at the young commuter market, and advertising comprised 31% of published content.
