= Gaelic Life =

Gaelic games newspaper

- Categories: Sport
- Frequency: Weekly
- Format: Tabloid
- Publisher: North West of Ireland Printing and Publishing Company
- First issue: 2007
- Country: Ireland
- Language: English
- Website: gaeliclife.com

Gaelic Life is a Gaelic games newspaper. It has been published since 2007.

As a weekly publication, it appears Thursdays. Though it offers coverage primarily of Gaelic games in the province of Ulster, it circulates through the other three provinces - Connacht, Leinster and Munster - as well.

Its columnists include former Derry All-Ireland winner Joe Brolly and former Donegal NFL and Ulster Championship winner Kevin Cassidy.

Gaelic Life has sponsored the Dr McKenna Cup.

National newspapers such as the website of the Irish Independent have cited Gaelic Life as a source, while public service broadcaster Raidió Teilifís Éireann has also acknowledged Gaelic Life.

== See also ==
- Kevin McGourty, Antrim footballer, hurler and former columnist with the newspaper
