= Strabane Chronicle =

Northern Irish newspaper

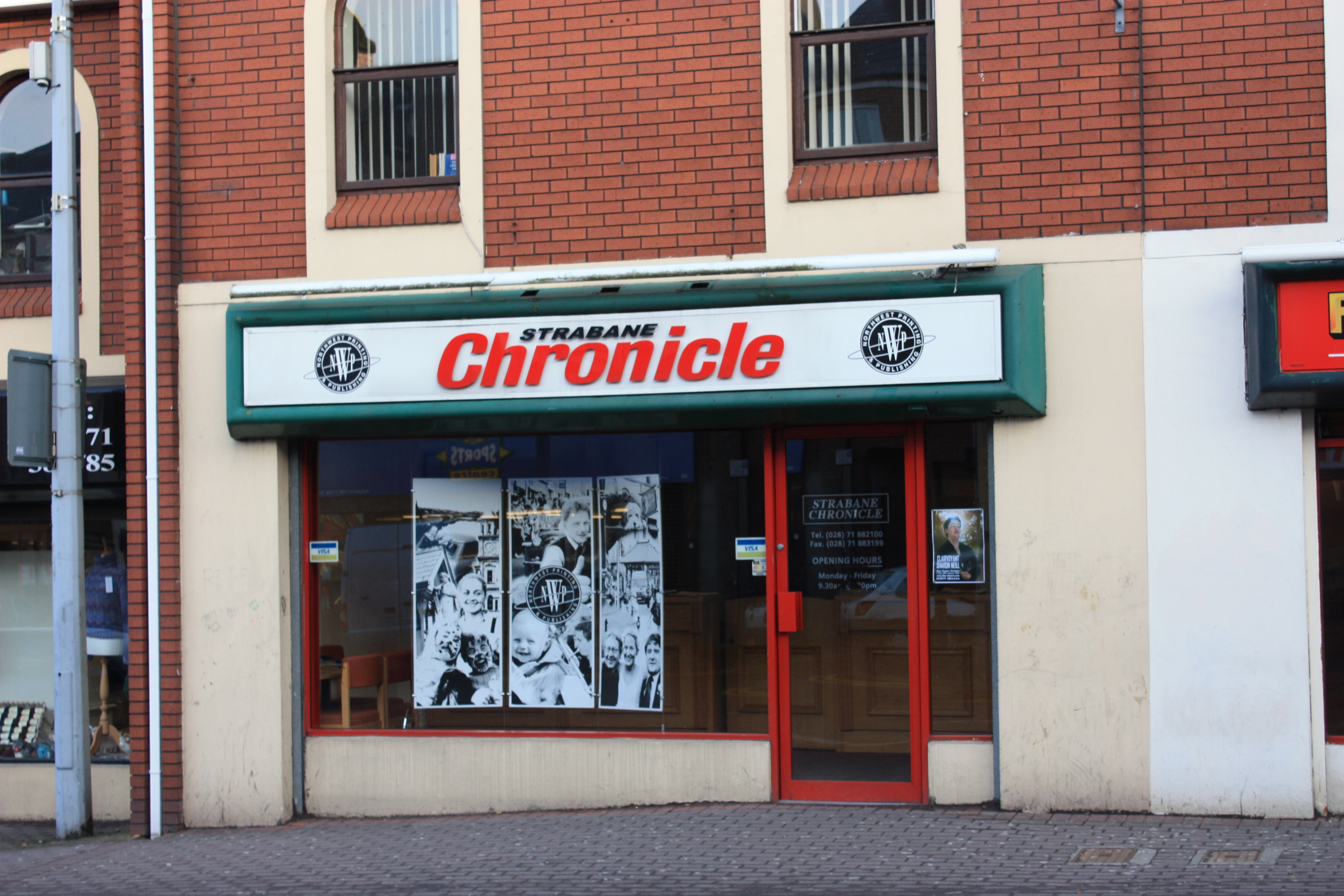
Strabane Chronicle, Main Street, Strabane, January 2010

The Strabane Chronicle is a newspaper based in Strabane, County Tyrone, Northern Ireland. The paper was started in 1896 as the Strabane Chronicle and Tyrone and Donegal Advertiser and was subsequently purchased by the North West of Ireland Printing and Publishing Company, which was established in 1901 by the Lynch family. The masthead was changed in 1969 and the paper became known as the Strabane Chronicle. The January to June 2010 ABC figure for the Strabane Chronicle is 5,560 and it continues to be the highest selling newspaper in Strabane.

Its sister titles include the Ulster Herald, Tyrone Herald, Donegal News (Monday and Friday editions), Fermanagh Herald and Gaelic Life.
