= The Dickson Herald =

Biweekly newspaper in Dickson, Tennessee, U.S.

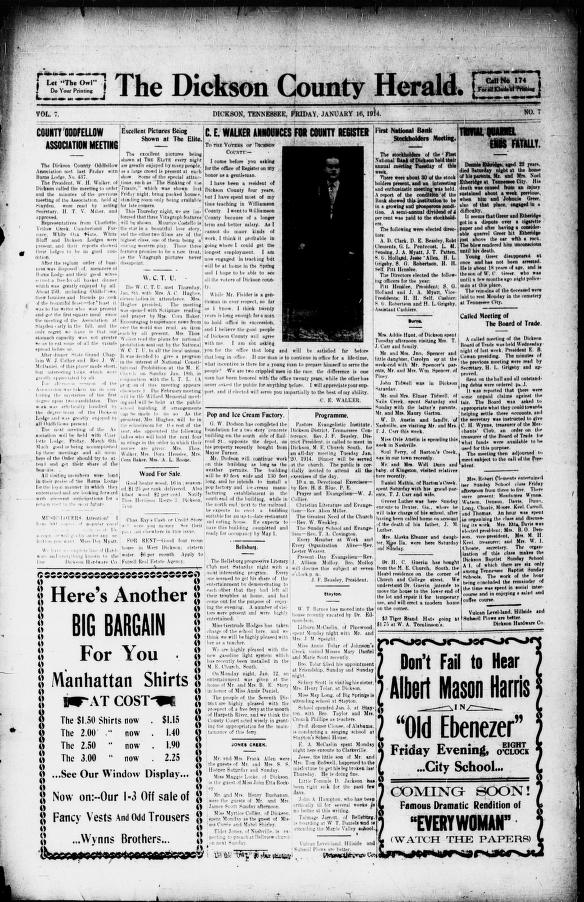
- The front page of the Dickson County Herald on January 16, 1914
- Type: Biweekly newspaper
- Owner: Gannett
- Founded: 1907
- City: Dickson, Tennessee
- Website: dicksonherald.com

The Dickson Herald is a biweekly newspaper published in Dickson, Tennessee, appearing each Wednesday and Friday. It was founded in 1907 as The Dickson County Herald, a weekly, and has periodically been published since as both a biweekly and triweekly. Since Gannett's buyout of Multimedia, Inc. it has published many articles in cooperation with the Middle Tennessee area's dominant daily newspaper, The Tennessean. The Herald serves as the newspaper of record for Dickson County, Tennessee; a considerable portion of its classified advertising revenue come from publishing legally required notices of court and other governmental actions. The Herald was actually printed in nearby Clarksville, Tennessee at the plant of another Gannett-owned newspaper, The Leaf-Chronicle for many years, and is now printed by The Tennessean, which in turn is consolidating its printing operations with those of another Gannett-owned newspaper, the Knoxville News-Sentinel
