= Headlight Herald =

Headlight Herald may refer to one of these U.S. newspapers:

- Headlight Herald (Tracy), a newspaper published in Tracy, Minnesota
- Headlight-Herald (Tillamook), a newspaper published in Tillamook, Oregon
