= Tyrone Daily Herald =

Newspaper in Pennsylvania, US

- Type: Daily newspaper
- Format: Broadsheet
- Owner: The Sample News Group, LLC
- Founder(s): H.R. Holtzinger (1833–1905); J.L. Holmes (1823–1894); C.S.W. Jones (1842–1905)
- Editor: Mark Leberfinger
- Founded: August 15, 1867; 158 year ago as The Tyrone Herald
- City: Tyrone, Pennsylvania
- Country: United States
- Circulation: 8,000 (as of 2021)
- OCLC number: 12684400
- Website: samplenewsgroup.com

The Tyrone Daily Herald is an American daily newspaper serving Tyrone, Pennsylvania, and region – northern Blair County and nearby portions of Centre and Huntingdon Counties. The newspaper has been running for one hundred and fifty-eight years, the latter one hundred and thirty-eight as a daily.

== History ==
The Tyrone Daily Herald was founded as a weekly newspaper, the Tyrone Herald, on August 15, 1867, by H.R. Holtsinger (alternatively spelled Holtzinger and Holsinger; né Henry Ritz Holsinger; 1833–1905) and J.L. Holmes (né Jonathan Lorenzo Holmes; 1823–1894). In 1868, Holtzinger and Holmes took on a partner, Charles Sullivan Worrell Jones (1842–1905), as half owner. Shortly thereafter, in 1868, Jones purchased the interests of Holtzinger and Holmes. Jones served as the editor beginning in 1868. Holtzinger was a Brethren minister who, after selling his interest in the Herald, founded a denominational paper, the Christian Family Companion.

The Daily Herald became a daily publication on April 16, 1887.

== Selected holding companies, publishers, managers, and editors ==
=== Holding companies ===
1867–1868: Holtzinger & Holmes
1868–1871: Holmes & Jones
1871–1872: Brainerd & Jones – W.H.H. Brainerd (né William Henry Harrison Brainerd; 1841–1880) was an owner with C.S.W. Jones from 1871 to 1872
1873–1905: C.S.W. Jones Co.
1962: Tyrone Herald Company

19??–1986: John C. Chamberlain (né John Calvin Chamberlain, Sr.; 1912–1991) and Nannie M. Chamberlain (née Nannie Rebecca Miles; 1911–1994), and wife of John C. Chamberlain and sister of Philip Kephart Miles, Jr. (1914–1985)

1986–1989: Offset News, Inc., was founded by Phil Miles in 1969. On November 4, 1986, Christophe Philip Miles, Phil's grandson, purchased Offset News and the 50% interest in the Tyrone Daily Herald owned by John C. Chamberlain. And, at that time, he assumed the role of President of Offset News. Offset News had, since 1969, been printing The Daily News of Huntingdon. Offset News, Inc., sold its interest in the Tyrone Daily Herald to The Joseph F. Biddle Publishing Company, effective March 1, 1989.

1989–1991: The Joseph F. Biddle Publishing Company, based in Huntingdon, Pennsylvania, was incorporated in 1935, and became publisher of The Daily News of Huntingdon, which was first published on February 1, 1922, by Joseph Franklin Biddle (1871–1936). Joseph's son, John Hunter Biddle (1905–1977), was editor of The Daily News from 1927 to 1936. When Joseph F. Biddle died in 1936, John took over as President of the holding company. One of Joseph's grandsons, El McMeen (born 1947) is a notable steel string fingerstyle guitarist.

As of 2017, George Raymond Sample III (born 1952), is listed as President. The Biddle family – namely two sons of Joseph Franklin Biddle, publishers John Hunter Biddle (1905–1977) and successor Joseph Franklin Biddle II (born 1936) – published The Daily News of Huntingdon, Pennsylvania, until October 21, 1991, when it was purchased by Sample News Group, LLC, headed by George R. Sample III and his wife, Marlene Sample (née Marlene Sue Kane; born 1952).

=== Publishers ===
1867–1868: Holtzinger & Holmes
1868–1871: Holmes & Jones
1871–1872: Brainerd & Jones – W.H.H. Brainerd (né William Henry Harrison Brainerd; 1841–1880) was an owner with C.S.W. Jones from 1871 to 1872
1873–1905: C.S.W. Jones
1905–1924: Claude Jones (1865–1924). Claude's father, David Mattern Jones (1838–1877) was a brother of Charles Sullivan Worrell Jones

1924-1952: Benjamin Charles Jones (US Army, Brigadier General, Retired; 1896–1974). He was the great-nephew of Charles Sullivan Worrell Jones, and was the son of Claude Jones. Following the death of his father, he and his sister, Mary Elizabeth Jones (1898–1991), married in 1932 to Charles Lintgen, MD (1894–1987), a gynecologist based in Philadelphia.

1962: Paul M. Kienzle (1894–1972), John Calvin Chamberlain (1912–1991), and Philip Kephart Miles, Jr. (1914–1985), acquired the newspaper from B.C. Jones and sister, Elizabeth Lintgen in 1963 and, together, ran it until Kienzle died in 1972. Then Chamberlain and Miles ran it until November 4, 1986, when Offset News, Inc., acquired the 50% interest owned by Chamberlain.

1994: George Raymond Sample III

=== General managers ===
1948–1962: Paul M. Kienzle (1894–1972)
1994: Harry J. Hartman (born 1970)

=== Editors ===
1867–1869: J.L. Holmes (1823–1897)
S.W. Jones
Al Tyhurst (né Alfred Tyhurst; 1842–1882)
1962: W. Paul Price (né William Paul Price; 1918–1984) had worked in various roles at the newspaper from about 1950 until his retirement in 1980. He started as Sport Editor.
1994: Daniel Meckes, News Editor

== Archives ==
=== Digital searchability ===
- Tyrone Herald, Library of Congress, 1867–1918; LCCN sn85055122; OCLC 12617764
- Tyrone Daily Herald, Library of Congress, 1887–current; LCCN sn86083395; OCLC 12684400
- Ancestry.com:

1887–1910
1916–1940
1943–1949
1951
1975–1977
