= Chicago Herald =

The Chicago Herald may refer to the following newspapers:

- The Chicago Herald (1881–95), merged with the Chicago Times in 1895 to form the Chicago Times-Herald
  - The Chicago Record-Herald, its successor, published from 1901 to 1914
    - The Chicago Herald (1914–18), its successor, known as the Chicago Herald-Examiner from 1918 to 1939
      - The Chicago Herald-American, its successor from 1939 to 1953
- The Daily Herald (Arlington Heights), published since 1871
