= Fermanagh Herald =

Northern Irish newspaper

- Type: Weekly newspaper
- Format: Compact
- Owner(s): North West of Ireland Printing and Publishing Company
- Founded: 1902
- Headquarters: Enniskillen, County Fermanagh
- Circulation: 13,169
- Website: www.fermanaghherald.com

The Fermanagh Herald is a weekly newspaper published and sold mainly in County Fermanagh, Northern Ireland. It was established in 1902 by the North West of Ireland Printing and Publishing Company, which had been established a year earlier by the Lynch family. The paper is published every Wednesday, and has the largest circulation of any North West of Ireland Printing and Publishing Company title, averaging at 13,169 for the first half of 2010. Its sister titles include the Ulster Herald, Tyrone Herald, Donegal News (Monday and Friday editions), Strabane Chronicle and Gaelic Life.
