= The Herald-Press (Harvey, North Dakota) =

Weekly newspaper in Harvey, North Dakota

Coordinates: 47.769157°N 99.935919°W

- Type: Weekly newspaper
- Format: Broadsheet
- Owner: Eldredge Publishing
- Founder: R.L. Price
- Publisher: Jason Nordmark
- Founded: 1896
- Language: English
- Headquarters: Harvey, North Dakota
- ISSN: 8750-6882
- OCLC number: 11671842
- Website: heraldpressnd.com

The Herald-Press is a weekly newspaper published in Harvey, North Dakota in the United States. The paper's circulation is around 2,100.

== History ==
On May 7, 1896, R.L. Price published the first edition of the Harvey Herald. In 1897, J. Kenneth McLeod, better known as "Little Mac," bought the Herald, but Price soon resumed ownership. In 1901, Price bought and absorbed the Harvey Advertiser.

In 1910, James H. Cramer sold the Herald to Charles B. Thomas. In 1917, J.F. Richards acquired the Herald and merged it into the Harvey Journal. In 1918, James "Jim" Milloy acquired the Journal. The paper was later renamed back to the Herald. In 1925, a corporation that included Adolph P. Barstad as an owner was formed to manage the Herald. Mark F. Staples bought the paper in 1928, and then sold it back to Barstad in 1932.

The Herald was acquired by Russel A. Young in 1945, followed by S. Hugh Farrington in 1946. His son Stephen H. Farrington joined him at the Herald in 1952, but left a few months later after leasing the Wells County Free Press of Fessenden. In 1956, he bought into the Herald and rejoined his father.

In 1968, S. Hugh Farrington retired. Stephen H. Farrington operated both the Herald and the Press until 1983, when he sold them to Charles and Marion Eldredge. In 1985, the two papers were merged to form The Herald-Press. In 1991, Charles L. Eldredge Sr. was elected president of the North Dakota Newspaper Association. In 2014, C.L. Eldredge died. In 2026, Marion Eldredge died.
