= Ulster Herald =

Northern Irish newspaper

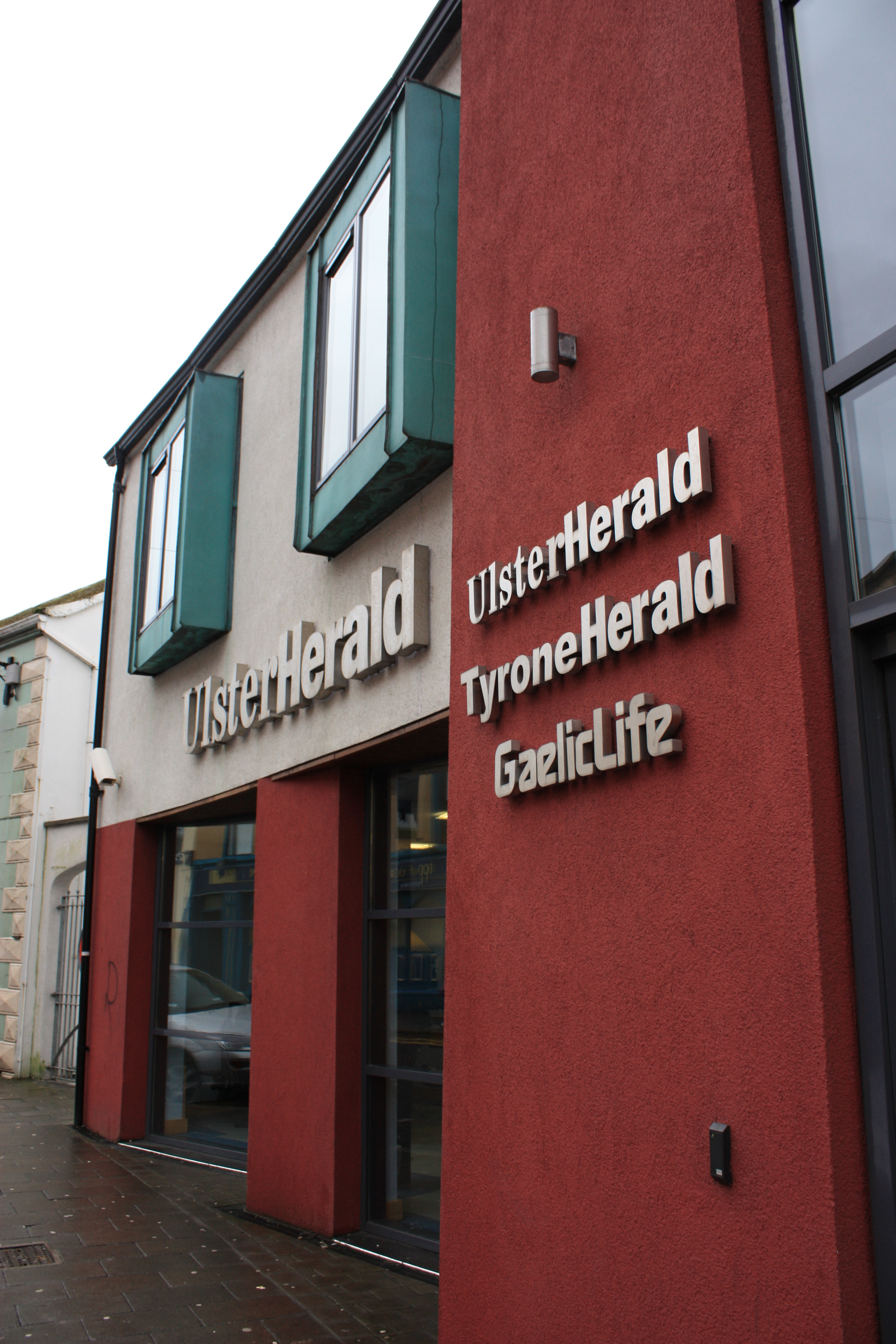
Ulster Herald offices, John Street, Omagh, January 2010

The Ulster Herald is a weekly newspaper based in Omagh, County Tyrone, Northern Ireland and is known locally as The Herald.

It is published by the North West of Ireland Printing and Publishing Company. The Ulster Herald is published by Interpress alongside sister papers the Fermanagh Herald, Strabane Chronicle and Donegal News. The company also launched a new paper The Dungannon Herald in 2017 to cater for the east of County Tyrone.

The company launched Tyrone Herald a decade ago, which is released on a Monday and covers the weekend's sporting action as well as including more light-hearted features. The Ulster Herald remains the company's flagship paper and is still sold in its traditional Thursday slot.

== Format ==
The newspaper was founded in 1901, and retained much of the same format until 2001, when a major reformat took place. This new format helped the paper claim the Newspaper Society's Weekly Newspaper of the Year awards for 2003 and 2004.

From the 22 June 2006 issue, a new compact format was established, following almost unanimous requests from the readership. It has been reflected that after this unveiling of a compact edition that some readers now hark back to the days of the County's oldest newspaper being a broadsheet.

The current title editor is Nigel McDonagh.

== Circulation ==
The paper's circulation, for the January to June 2010 period, is 12,311. The circulation increased from 10,000 in 1998 to 12,500 in 2003. It is one of the few papers in the region to maintain a strong circulation in the face of the challenges facing the print media.
