= Metro Herald (Virginia) =

Defunct African-American newspaper published in Alexandria, Virginia, USA

- Metro Herald in 2005
- Type: Weekly newspaper
- Owner: Davis Communications Group
- Editor: Paris D. Davis
- Founded: 1990; 36 years ago
- Ceased publication: February 2018; 8 years ago
- Language: English
- Headquarters: 901 North Washington Street, Suite 603; Alexandria, Virginia
- Country: United States
- Circulation: 42,000 (as of 2005)
- Website: themetroherald.com

The Metro Herald was an African American newspaper published in Alexandria, Virginia for more than 25 years, covering Maryland, Washington DC and Virginia from the early 1990s to February 2018.

It was owned by Davis Communications Group, Inc. and was a member of the Virginia Press Association. In 1999, founder Paris Davis became chief executive officer of the startup Baltimore Press.

The format of the Metro Herald was a 24-page full-color paper, with a large Community News section as well as a classified ad section.
