= Metro Herald (Irish newspaper) =

Commuter newspaper in Dublin, Ireland

- Type: Morning newspaper
- Format: Compact
- Owner(s): IN&M; The Irish Times; DMGT
- Founded: 2010
- Ceased publication: 2014
- Sister newspapers: The Irish Times; Irish Daily Mail; Irish Independent

Metro Herald was the title of a free daily commuter newspaper in Dublin, Ireland. It was formed in 2010 following the merger of two previously competing publications, Metro Ireland and Herald AM, to create a profit for their respective backers, including Independent News & Media, Daily Mail and General Trust, and The Irish Times.

The newspaper ceased publication on 19 December 2014. 13 jobs were lost. The company said that the newspaper had become "unsustainable".
