= Acrosport =

Acrosport may refer to:

- One of two aerobatic sports aeroplanes, Acro Sport I and Acro Sport II
- A dance sequence from Ovo (Cirque du Soleil)
- A range of athletic or sports activities including:
  - Acrobatic gymnastics
  - Acrobalance
  - Gymnastic formation
  - A human pyramid
  - A Human tower (gymnastic formation) and similar cultural activities:
    - Castell, human towers performed in Catalonia, Spain
    - Muixeranga, human towers in the Valencian Community
    - Govinda sport, human towers to celebrate the birth of Krishna
