= Human tower =

Human tower may refer to:

- Human tower (gymnastic formation), a performance variation of the gymnastic formation, exhibited frequently in Japan
- Human pyramid
- Castells, human towers built in Catalonia
- Govinda sport, human towers built in India
