= Muixeranga =

Street dance tradition in Valencia, Spain

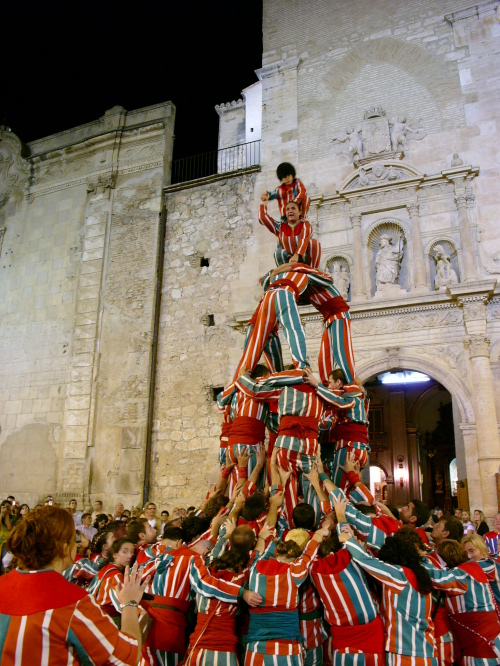
Muixeranga of Algemesi

The Muixeranga (Valencian: [mujʃeˈɾaŋɡa]) is the collective name given to the performance of ancient street dances and human pyramids or castells, originating in the ancient Kingdom of Valencia (currently the Land of Valencia), which are still preserved in the town of Algemesí, 30 km (19 mi) southwest from Valencia, and certain other Valencian towns.

The muixeranga is much more than an artistic acrobatic dance. It is a collection of ancient human choreographies of enormous plasticity illustrating various figures and shapes, which are held during the Algemesí town festival (September 7 and 8th), in honor of the Virgin of Health (Mare de Déu de la Salut).

The Muixeranga resembles the modern castellers in many ways, the latter being spread all over Catalonia. Both traditions share the same origin, the "Moixiganga", (a series of dances of human towers) once found throughout the Iberian Peninsula. Muixeranga differs from castellers mainly in that the Muixeranga has a religious background and is accompanied by a traditional dance, it is also focused in the height of the human towers, but focuses also in the complexity and technique in order to create a plastic, figurative scene.

Starting in 1996, several muixeranga groups have appeared, most of them in areas where muixeranga has not been traditionally practiced in modern times. These new groups are known as Noves Muixerangues. As of 2025, there are 25 registered muixeranga groups, most of which are Noves Muixerangues.

Logo of intangible cultural heritage, UNESCO

== Origin and evolution ==
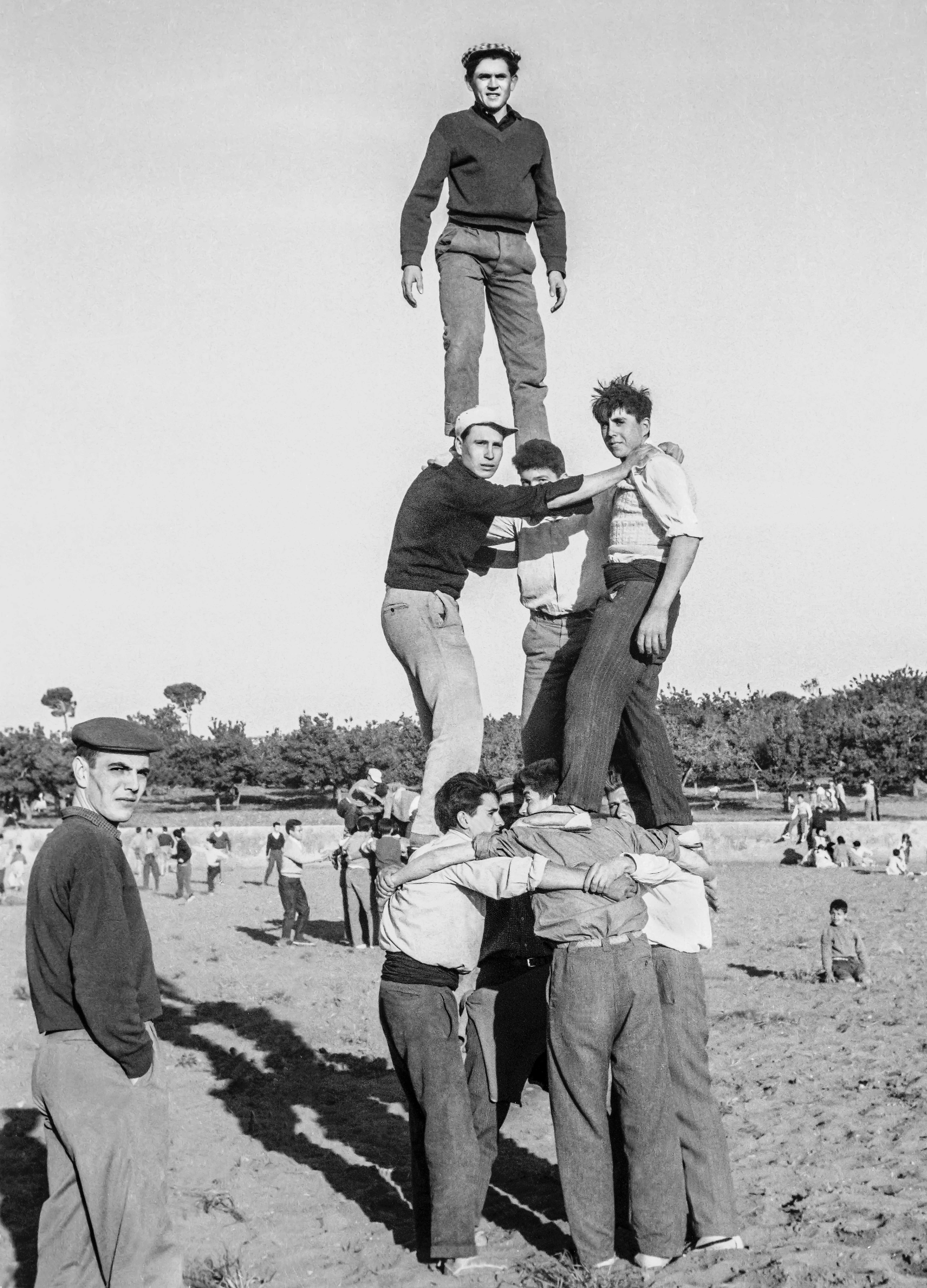
Muixeranga in 1960, Carlet

There are several theories on the origin of muixeranga, especially in relation to its name. The first theory advocates that the word comes from the Arabic word mochain, meaning "mask". A second theory links it with ancient processions held on the streets to commemorate some special event.

Even though the tradition in the Iberian Peninsula may date back to the 13th century, the first written record of the muixeranga in Algemesí can be traced to the first third of the 18th century. However, its constant, strong presence suggests a much older origin.

The first solemn celebrations of the Virgin of Health happened in 1724, so this is the earliest that the muixeranga could be linked to this celebration. However, the first concrete date comes from the town account book in the year 1733, when the dulzaina players employed in the festival were given an annual stipend.

The guilds were the real driving force behind the event, and in changing times, they died out. The Muixeranga began to wane and by 1973 it had almost disappeared altogether. A group including writer Martí Domínguez i Barberà, Mayor Manuel Rico, Vicent Raga, festival organiser in the Capella neighbourhood, and Father Vicent Castell Maiques, with the support of the students’ association Associació d'Antics Alumnes dels Maristes, were responsible for re-launching it under the guidance of Tomàs Pla. A year later the Friends of assossiació Muixeranga was founded. Eloi Miralles, a member of the Colla de Castellers de Vilafranca del Penedès, arranged for the muixeranguers to visit the Penedès capital and on August 31, 1978, the Muixeranga rose up in Villafranca's main square, banishing forever that lack of visibility which might have proved fatal.

== La Mare de Déu de la Salut Festival ==
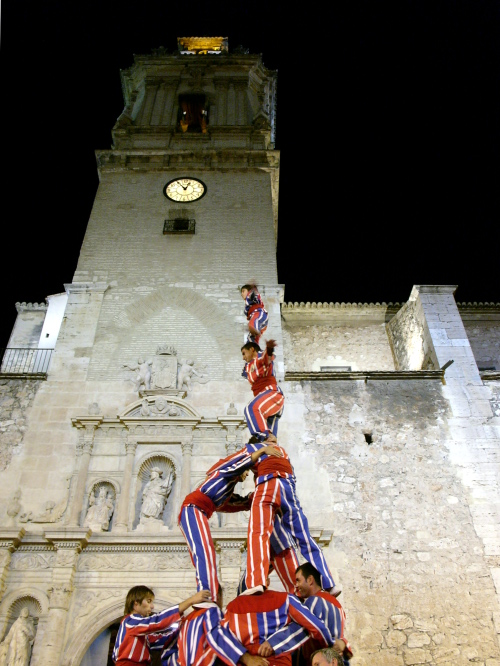
Muixeranga in front of church Sant Jaume d'Algemesí.

The main event where Muixeranga is traditionally performed is at the feast of Our Lady of Health in Algemesí.

The feast day of Our Lady of Health, patroness of Algemesí is September 8, and commemorates the legendary discovery in 1247 of a statue depicting the Madonna and Child. The image venerated in the town since the mid-twentieth century is a replica, because during the Civil War the original image of the Virgin of Health was destroyed, as was the chapel. The festival appears to have originated in a street party in the area of the Chapel of Finding and gradually spread to other neighborhoods. The main celebration in held on 7 and 8 September, is preceded by a novena at the Chapel of the Finding, which begins August 29 and ends on September 6. The festival has preserved traditional dances and music, and has served as a source for the recovery of dances that formally existed in other locations and have been able to be re-established.

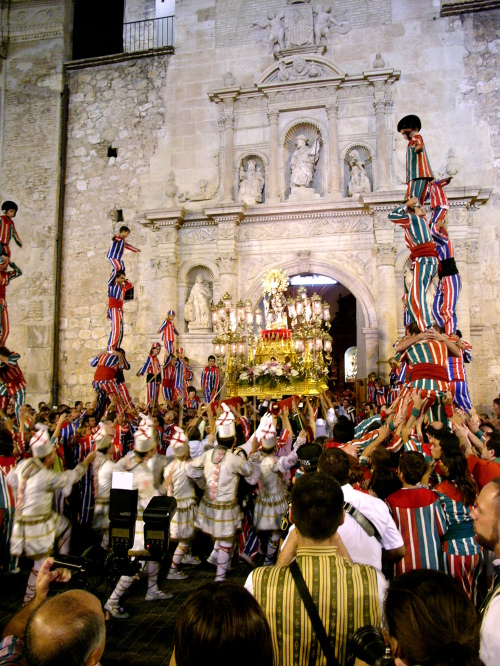
Festivity of 'la Mare de Déu de la Salut' of Algemesí.

The involvement of the town's inhabitants is the foundation upon which the continuity of this celebration is based. Each ritual works and has been prepared independently since the 18th Century. From the “Muixeranga” through to each of the dances, the different variations and musical scores have been passed from generation to generation. In the early 18th Century the dances belonged to different guilds; for example, the “Muixeranga” was the domain of construction workers, the “Carxofa” of the weavers, and so on. But social changes brought modifications to this custom and the traditions opened up to include people from other professional sectors. UNESCO has recognized the ritual, festive and community participation dimension of the Valencian celebration Our Lady of Health as part of the "intangible heritage of humanity".

The Festivity of “la Mare de Déu de la Salut” has been studied by ethno-anthropologists, sociologists and historians. It has inspired artists, musicians and poets. All of these people have remarked on the breadth of the cultural content of this event. Artistic groups such as the “Muixeranga”; dances like “els Bastonets” or “els Tornejants”; or the music that accompanies the performances are all the result of having conserved a fundamental part of the cultural heritage of an entire town. It was this popularity and interest in the tradition that led to the creation in 2002, of the Museu Valencià de la Festa (a Museum dedicated to the Festivity); which offers exhibitions and research into the Festivity. At the centre, visitors can learn about the history, the ritual acts, the dances, the music and the costumes of the celebration, as well as enjoying many stories from the event.

=== Processions ===
==== The Promeses Processó ====
At nightfall on 7 September, the beginning of the festivities is signaled by the ringing of the bells of the Basilica of St. James the Apostle. When the ringing stops and silence descends, the first notes of the flutes are sounded and the first of the processions begins. The procession, which begins with the mysteries and martyrdoms, (short theatrical pieces, performed by groups of children), has a scrupulous order with the towers of the Muixeranga second, followed by the Bastonets, the Carxofa, the Arquets, the Pastoretes, Bolero or llauradores, and the city band.

==== Morning Processoneta ====
On the morning of September 8, the Feast of the Nativity of Mary, there is a second, shorter procession known as the Morning Processoneta.

==== The Great Volta ====
The procession called the Great Volta, starts about 4:00 p.m. and is the longest, lasting over seven hours. Starting from the Basilica of St. James, the traditional dances of Algemesí and the image of the patron pass back through the old city, repeating the original itinerary of 1724.

== Characteristics ==
After the mysteries and martyrdoms, all the processions display a series of dances; the Muixerangas leads the rest. The Muixerangas, a set of tableaux composed of human towers and representative figures, has several stages, and opens with all muixerangueros dancing in two rows with candles burning. The dance is accompanied by the music of drum and flute. The muixerangueros then form a human tower moving to the sound of the music. The tower is topped by a child with open arms.

The forms of the Muixerangas assume plastic or pliable shapes that open or appear to form different figures which have all Marian symbolism. The Valencian town of Algemesi and its Muixeranga, lays claim to being the origin of the castells found throughout Catalonia.

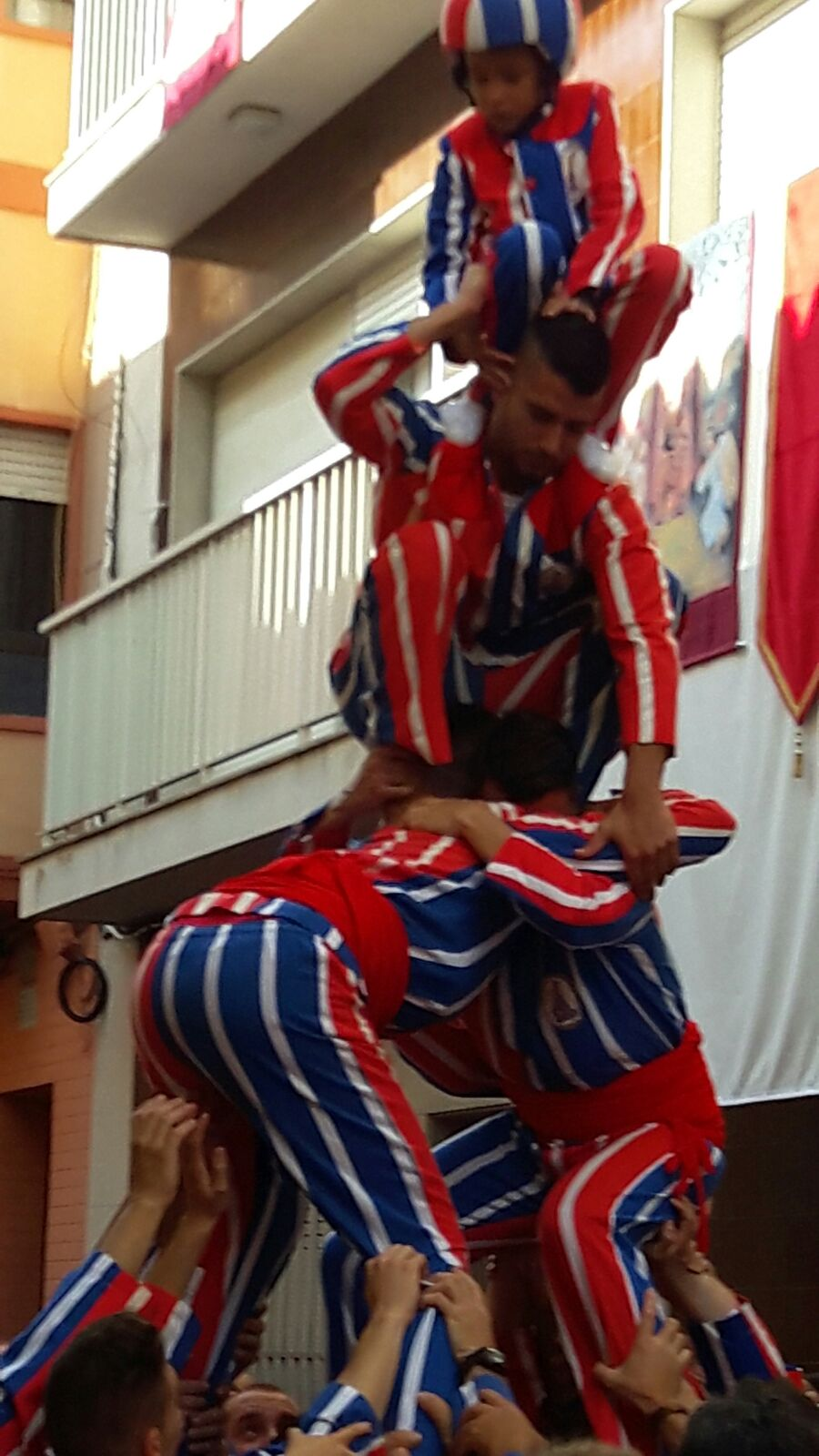
muixerangers preparing the elevation of muixeranga tower.

The people composing the castles are usually a group of people, of virtually any profession, but preferably of strength and physical skill. Nowadays, around 200 people participate in the plastic figures, but historically there were not more than thirty. There is a master, or conductor, which coordinates the dance and the human castles, towers and other figures, as well as admitting and training new people.

The clothes are idiosyncratic in many ways. They are composed of a shirt, trousers, farmer's shoes and sometimes a special hat. The fabric is coloured with vertical red and blue stripes on a white base, like a harlequin. It seems that this strange appearance is unintentional. Older people can still remember that they were once made from old mattress fabric.

Accompanying the group, some young members carry some jugs cut in half and painted with stripes with typical colors of the same muixeranga (designed by former member Juan Ezquer in 1973) which serves to collect funds for the activities of Muixeranga.

== Music and symbology ==
The Muixeranga song
Performed by Xavier Richart

The dance is accompanied by the music of tabalet (a drum) and dolçaina (valencian shawm), with a very old characteristic tune, of unknown author. A few of the constructions have their own dolçaina tunes, different from the usual Muixeranga song.

Some people striving for the recovery of the Valencian culture and its language, such as Joan Fuster, have suggested the music of the Muixeranga as an anthem for the Valencian Community.

== See also ==
- Acrobalance
- Acrobatic gymnastics
- Govinda sport, events to celebrate the birth of Krishna
- Gymnastic formation
- Human pyramid
- Castell or Human tower
