= Human pyramid =

Acrobatic formation

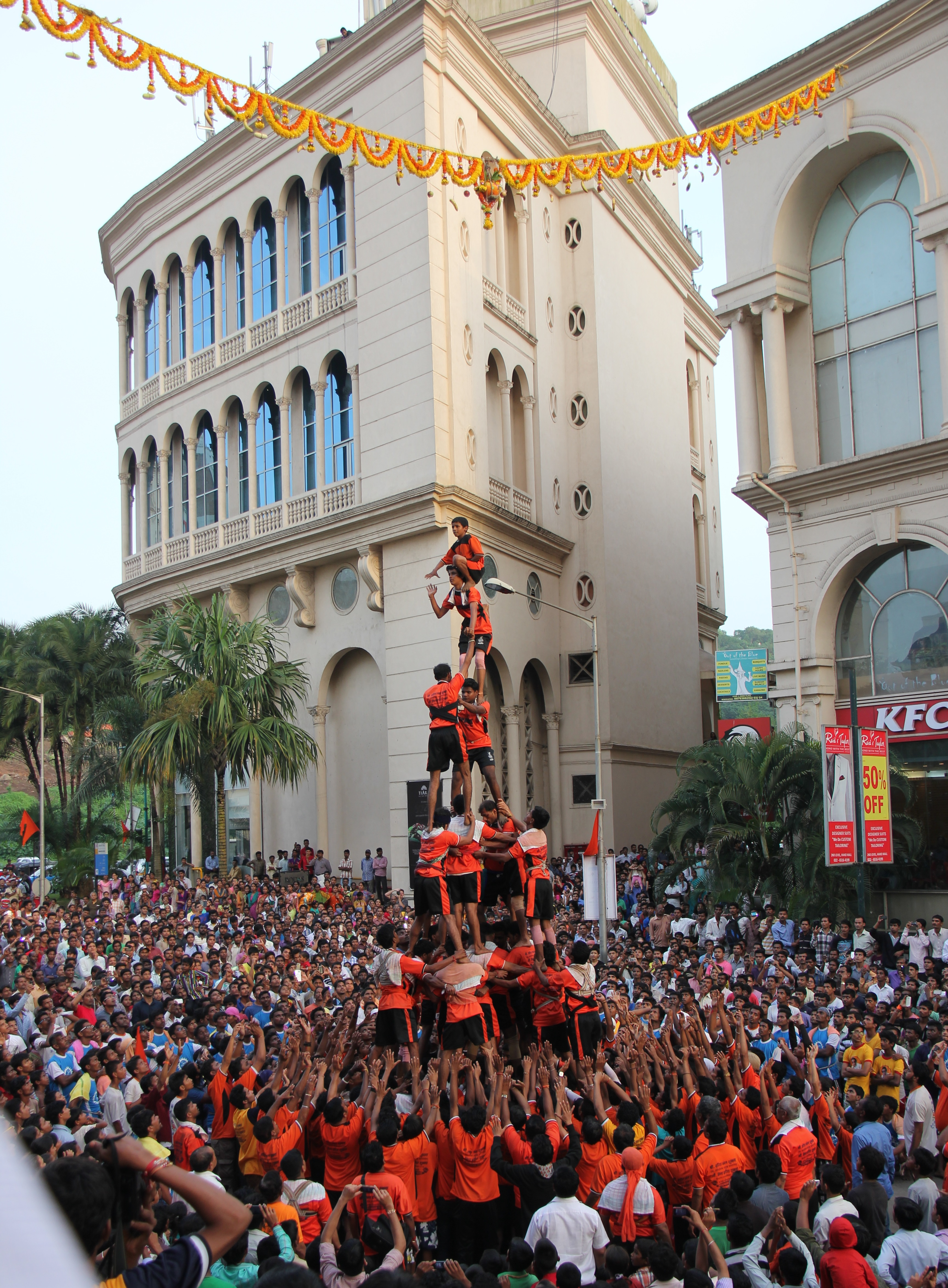
Govindas forming a human pyramid to reach the Dahi Handi in Hiranandani Gardens, Mumbai.

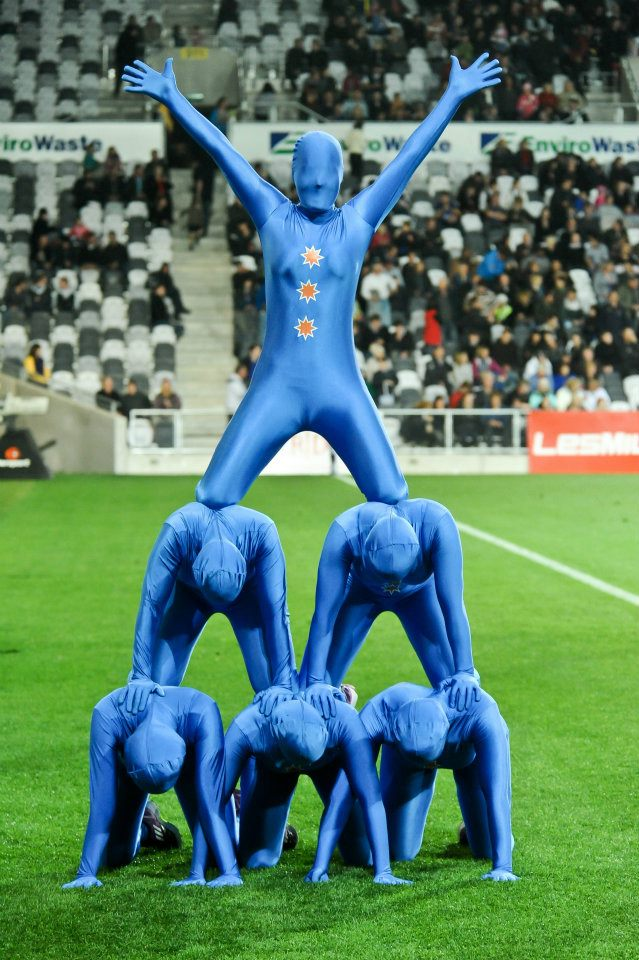
Human pyramid by the Otago Dancers, at an Otago Highlanders game, May 2012.

A human pyramid is an acrobatic formation of three or more people in which two or more people support a tier of higher people, who in turn may support other, higher tiers of people. People above the bottom tier may kneel or stand on the shoulders, backs or thighs of the people below them. Typically, the number of people in each tier is one greater than the tier immediately above it, resulting in a triangular structure reminiscent of the formation's namesake.

For practical reasons, lighter people are often positioned higher in the formation and stronger, heavier people are located closer to the base. Human pyramids are performed in various activities, including cheerleading and in circus acrobatics.

== Traditions involving human pyramids ==
=== China ===
- Human pyramids are often formed to reach for the bun during the Chinese Bun Festival.

=== Czech Republic ===
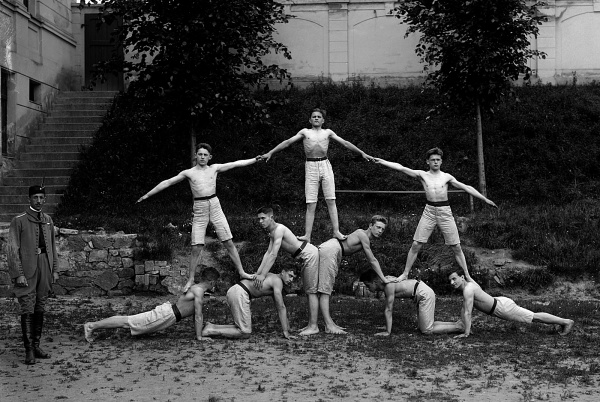
Sokol exercises in year 1924

- The Czech Sokol movement is a youth sport movement and gymnastics organization founded in Prague in 1862. It was primarily a fitness training center for the nation. The movement also spread across other Slavic regions. Some of the Sokol exercises included human pyramids.

=== India ===
- During the Hindu festival Krishna Janmashtami in Maharashtra, young men form human pyramids to reach pots filled with curd and butter and suspended high above the ground as part of the Dahi Handi ritual.

=== Spain ===
- Algemesí holds a Human Pyramid Festival annually on September 8 as a component of the Fiesta de La Virgen de la Salud (Virgin of Good Health). The muixeranga, or acrobats, form the human towers.
- Catalonia

The "castellers" of Catalonia form human pyramids, named castells ("castles"), up to ten men high. In Catalonia, several statues commemorate this old tradition. In Tarragona the castellers form human towers during the Santa Tecla Festival in September and during the Sant Magi festival, held annually in mid-August.
The Falcons are traditional teams in Catalonia who build human pyramids and towers. They follow different rules from the ones of the castells.

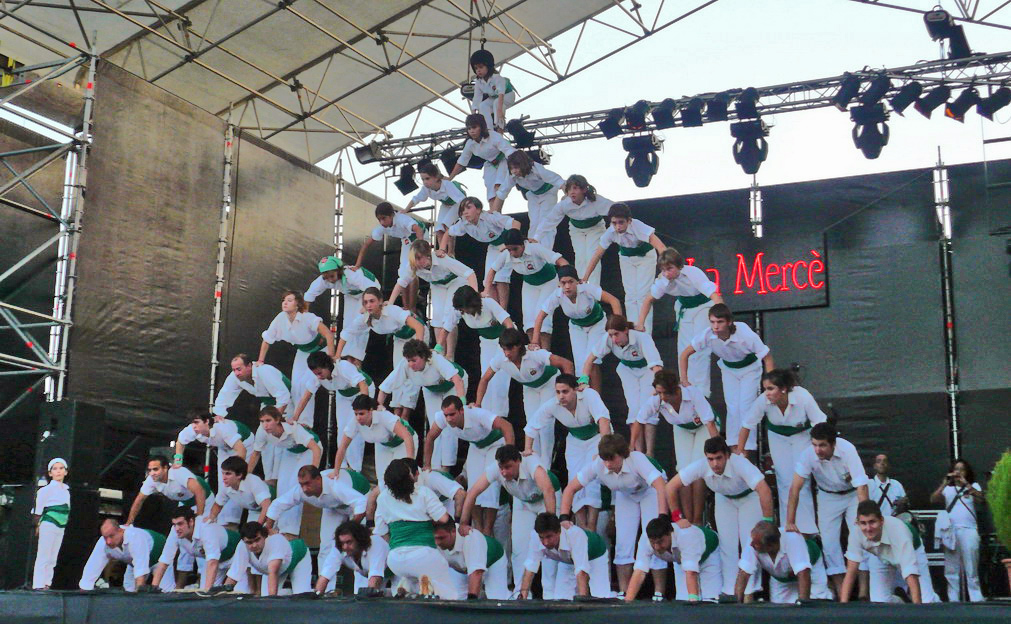
Human pyramid built by a "Falcons" team in Catalonia

=== United States ===
- Boy Scouts and Girl Scouts may hold competitions where the patrol that builds a human pyramid using all the scouts in their patrol the fastest, wins.
- University performance groups use human pyramids as large-scale acrobalance. The University of Maryland Gymkana Troupe keeps a tradition alive by building a series of pyramids during every one of their large shows. The Washington Adventist University Acro-Airs create 3-person high pyramids while combining cheer-based skills and tumbling passes.

=== Veneto ===
- In Venice until the eighteenth century there were human towers formed by Castellani and Nicolotti, inhabitants of different parts of Venice. Their human towers, maximum of 8 levels of men, were called Forze d'Ercole. At the top there was a child, usually called the Cimiereto.

== Cheerleading ==
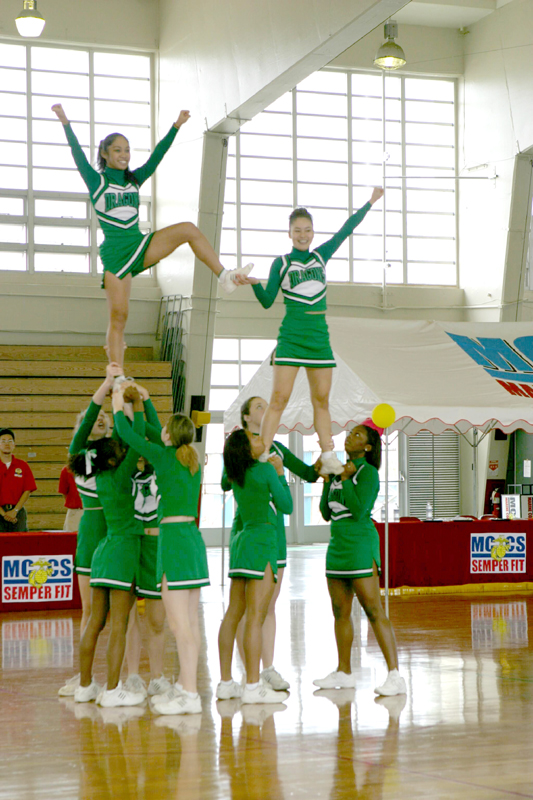
Cheerleaders warming up for competition

Cheerleaders may perform human pyramids with more difficult stunt sequences and gymnastics incorporated into routines. In cheerleading, pyramids are multiple groups of stunts connected aerially by the flyers. This connection may be made by simple linking of hands or having a multi-level pyramid. The flyers already in the air act as primary bases for another flyer or flyers on top of them.

== Safety ==
- Human pyramids at school sports days spark safety concerns the japan times SEP 25, 2014
- Gymnastic Formation-related Injury to Children in Physical Education (※PDF) Journal of Nippon Medical School. Accepted, September 27, 2015
- A scientific investigation of risk in large gymnastic formations(※PDF) Yutaka Nishiyama January-15 2017 NAID:120005972587

== See also ==
- Acrobalance
- Acrobatic gymnastics
- Castell
- Dahi Handi, a similar tradition in India.
- Gymnastic formation
- Human tower (gymnastic formation)
- Muixeranga
