= Societat Musical d'Algemesí =

Spanish Cultural Association

The Societat Musical d'Algemesí (Valencian pronunciation: [sosieˈtad muziˈkal daʎdʒemeˈzi]; "The Musical Society of Algemesí") is one of the cultural associations in the city of Algemesí, Valencian Community, Spain.

It has a school and several instrumental groups for the students and the professionals of the society. The society is part of the Federation of Musical Societies of the Valencian Community.

La Banda Simfònica d'Algemesí 23 February 2013 realized on Plaça del Mercat in Algemesí the flashmob interpretant el Boléro of Maurice Ravel
