= La Mare de Déu de la Salut Festival =

Traditional festival in Algemesí, Spain

Festivity of ‘la Mare de Déu de la Salut’ of Algemesí
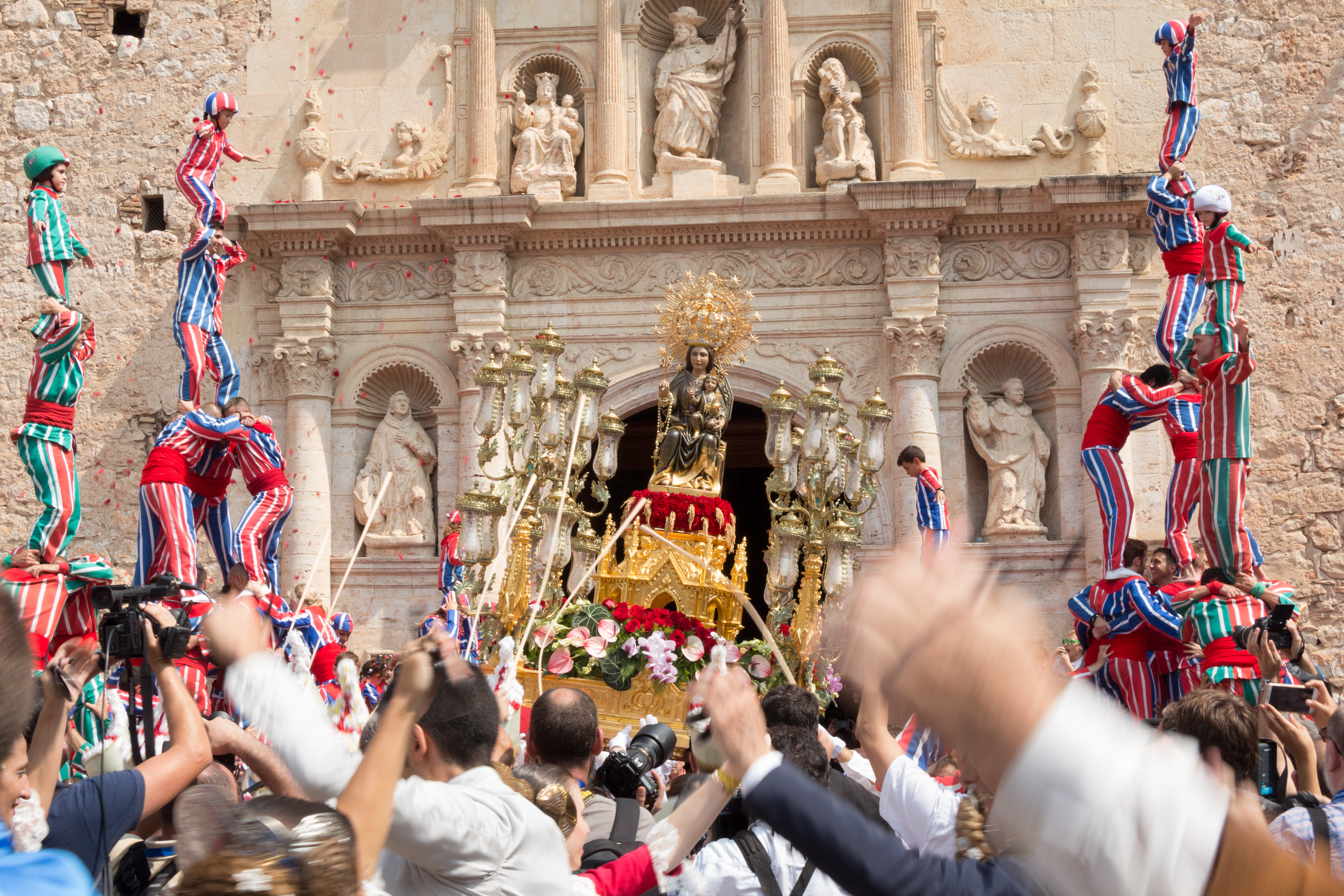
- Date: 29 August to 8 September
- Frequency: Annual
- Locations: Algemesí (Valencia), Spain
- Inaugurated: 1247

Festivity of ‘la Mare de Déu de la Salut’ of Algemesí
- UNESCO Intangible Cultural Heritage
- Country: Spain
- Reference: 00576
- Region: Europe and North America

Inscription history
- Inscription: 2011 (6th session)
- List: Representative

The Festivity of La Mare de Déu de la Salut is a festival celebrated in Algemesí (Valencia), Spain, from August 29 to September 8. The festival is in honour of the patron saint of Algemesí, La Mare de Déu de la Salut, and has been dated back to 1247. The holiday was awarded the UNESCO "Masterpieces of the Oral and Intangible Heritage of Humanity" designation on November 28, 2011.

== History ==
This celebration originated in medieval times (1247) and has been held in Algemesí on the 7 and 8 September to great popular acclaim since then. The traditional ritual acts of the event have been passed from generation to generation and are rich in: oral expression (theatre), music (63 compositions), dance and performances reminiscent of the Roman, Christian, Moorish and Jewish cultures which have woven the very fabric of this land and which are manifest in the creation of the musical instruments, melodies and costumes that are an integral part of this Festivity. The music of the traditional dolçaina and tabal, and the pieces for orchestra and timpani that provide musical accompaniment for the “Muixeranga” human towers and the dance performances of the “bastonets”, “pastoretes”, “carxofa”, “arquets”, “llauradores” and “tornejants”, recreate and stimulate a collective memory, transmitting universal messages of highly artistic visual and aural sentiments.

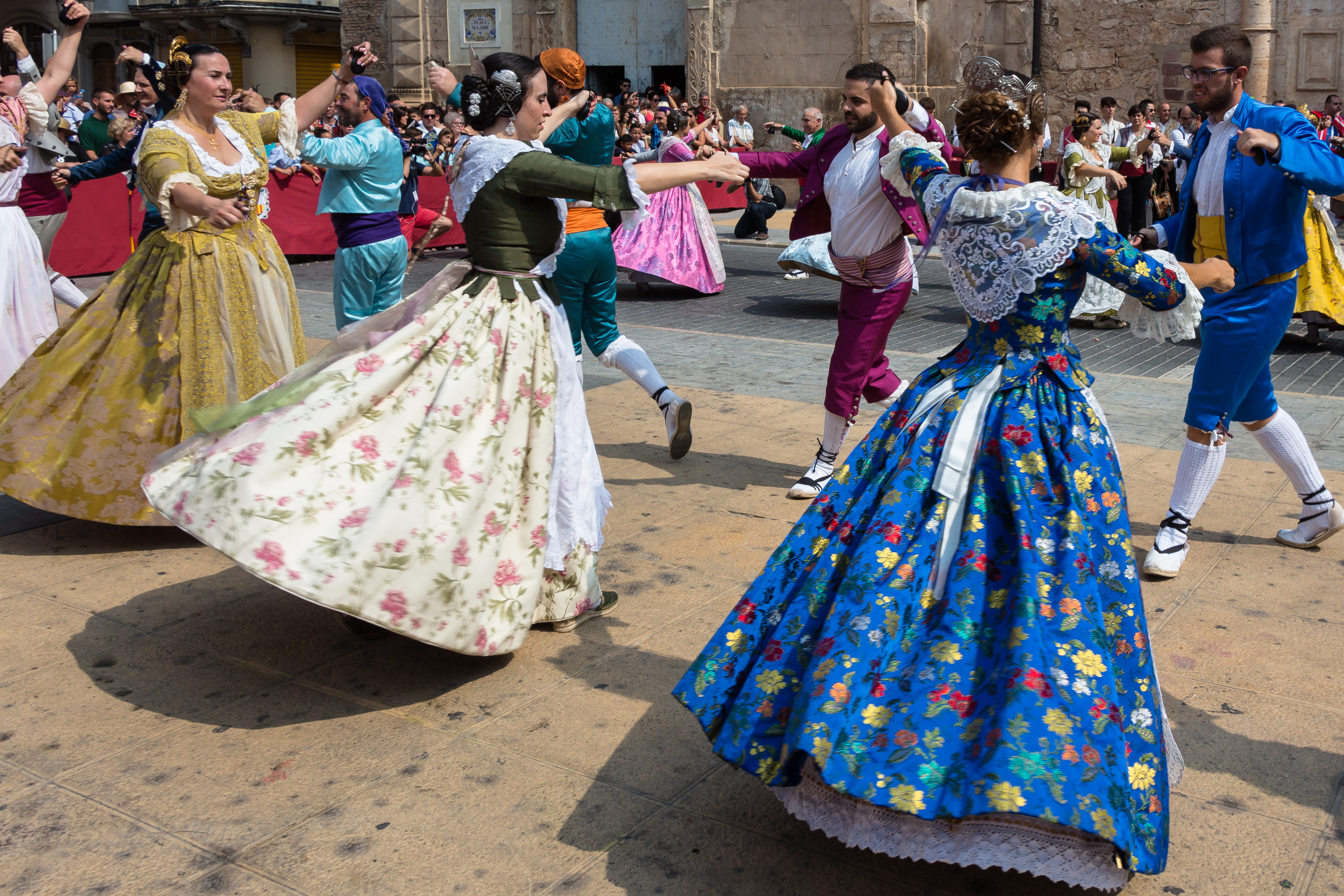
Dance of Llauradores.

Throughout the celebration, Algemesí becomes a living museum, testament to Valencian and Mediterranean traditions, interlaced with the faith, tradition and culture of the liturgical celebrations at the Basilica, the soundscapes created by the ringing of the bells and the 17th Century surroundings along the routes of the processions which over 1400 people take part in.

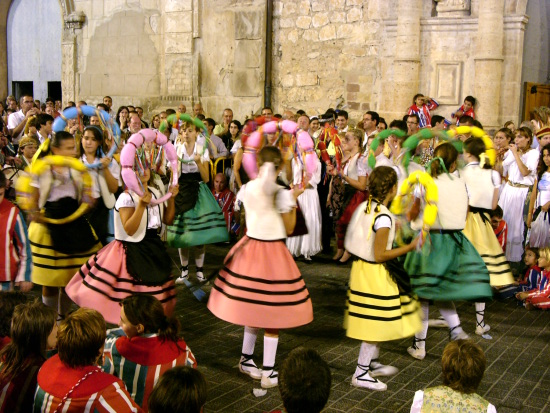
El ball d'arquets.

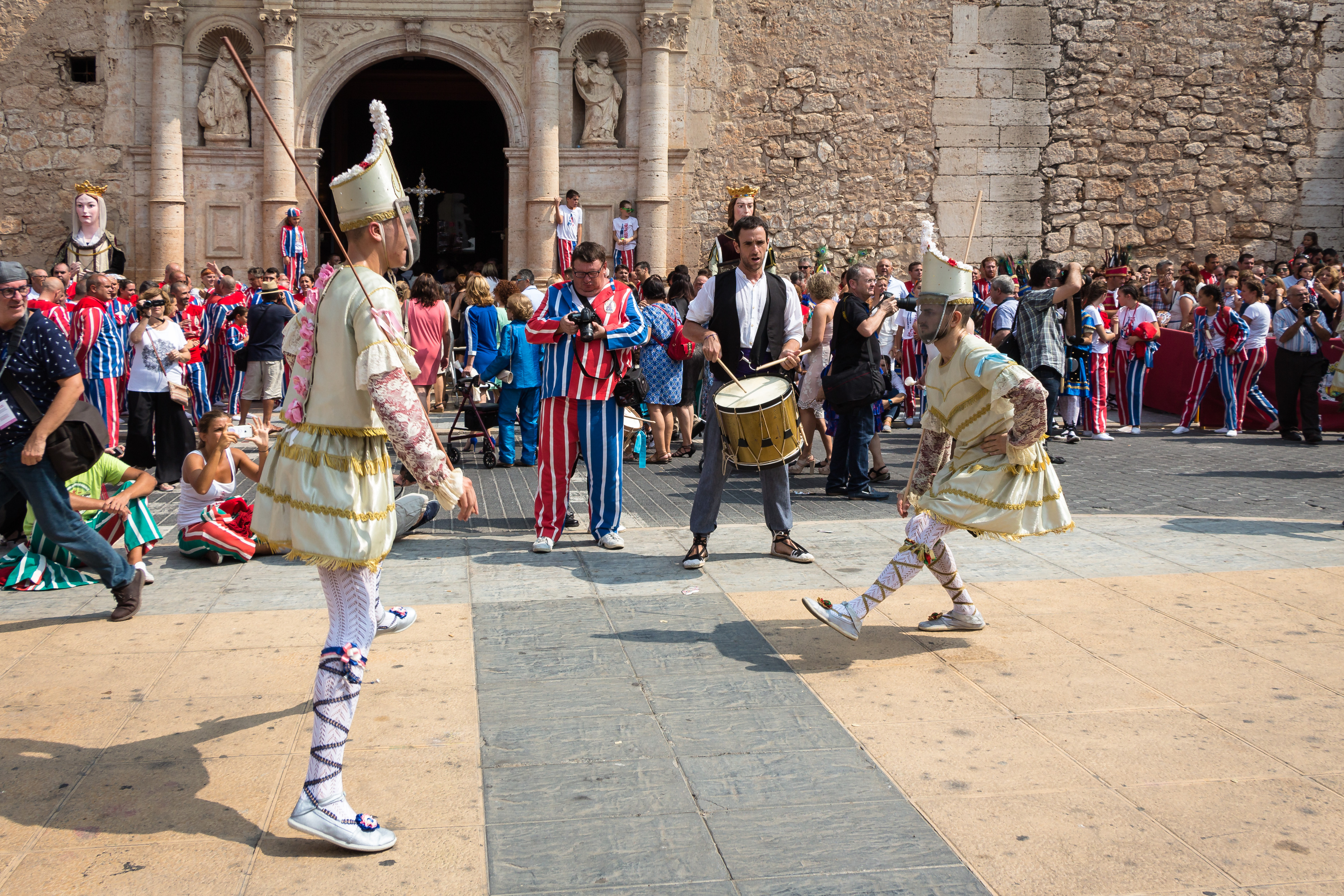
Tornetjants dancers.

== Characteristics ==
The feast day of Our Lady of Health, patroness of Algemesi is September 8, and commemorates the legendary discovery in 1247 of a statue depicting the Madonna and Child. The image venerated in the town since the mid-twentieth century is a replica, because during the Civil War the original image of the Virgin of Health was destroyed, as was the chapel. The festival appears to have originated in a street party in the area of the Chapel of Finding and gradually spread to other neighborhoods. The main celebration in held on 7 and 8 September, is preceded by a novena at the Chapel of the Finding, which begins August 29 and ends on September 6. The festival has preserved traditional dances and music, and has served as a source for the recovery of dances that formally existed in other locations and have been able to be re-established. The involvement of the town's inhabitants is the foundation upon which the continuity of this celebration is based. Each ritual works and has been prepared independently since the 18th Century. For this unique feature, UNESCO has recognized the ritual, festive and community participation dimension of the Valencian celebration Our Lady of Health as part of the "intangible heritage of humanity".[1]

La "Nit del Retorn" - on September 6 marks the beginning of the first big events of the Festival of the Mare de Deu de la Salut. At 20.30 hours it takes place the first parade (Volta General) through the streets of Algemesi accompanied by dolçainers and tabaleters, while at the end of the ninth which begins at 22 hours- at the door of the "Capella of Troballa" takes place the "Misteris i Martiris" representations by young children.

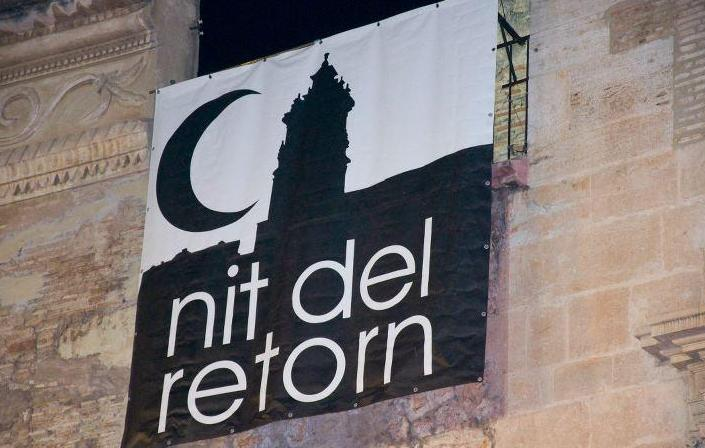
Parade night (Nit del Retorn).

The different acts and celebrations are organized by the people of Algemesí in the following collectives: The historical areas of the city, participants in the traditional dances and ritual acts, the Basilica of Saint James (Dant Jaume), and the Local Council. Together, these groups form the “Fundació per a la Festa de la Mare de Déu de la Salut” (Foundation for the Festivity) and are responsible for supervising and organizing the annual festivities. A group of approximately 20 people, covering three generations and representing all the groups and institutions involved in the festivity, make up the supervisory committee. The four historical areas of the city that were in existence in the 17th century (Valencia, La Muntanya, Santa Barbara and La Capella) take turns organizing the festivities on a four-year rotation.

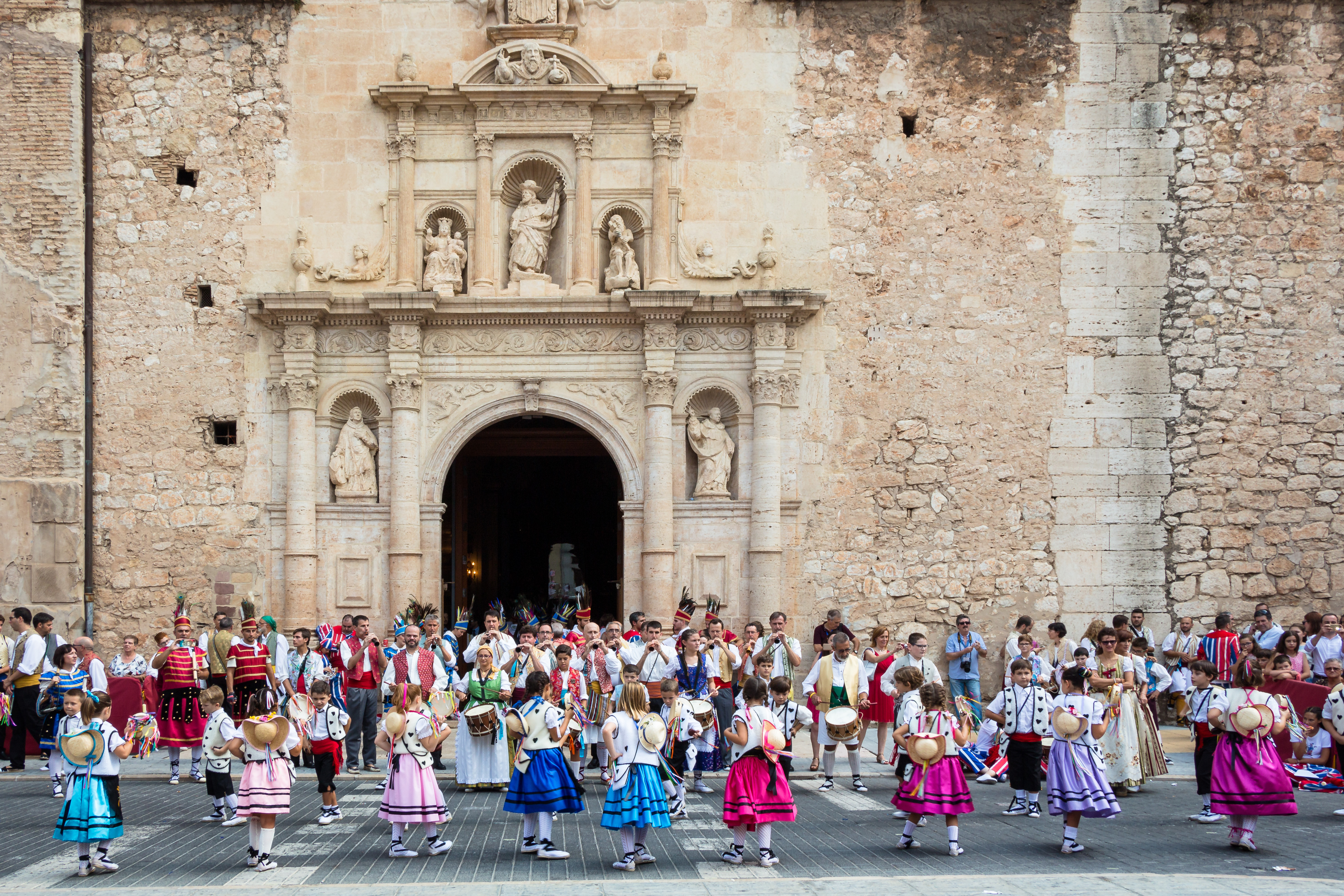
Dance of Pastoretes (young shepherds).

== Parades ==
The festival contains three parades on September 7–8, involving music, dancing, and Muixerangas. The first, the "Procession of Promises", takes place on September 7, and includes children acting out religious dramas. The second, the "Parade of the Morning", takes place the next day and includes representations of King James I of Aragon and his wife. The final parade, the "Volta General", contains depictions of biblical characters.

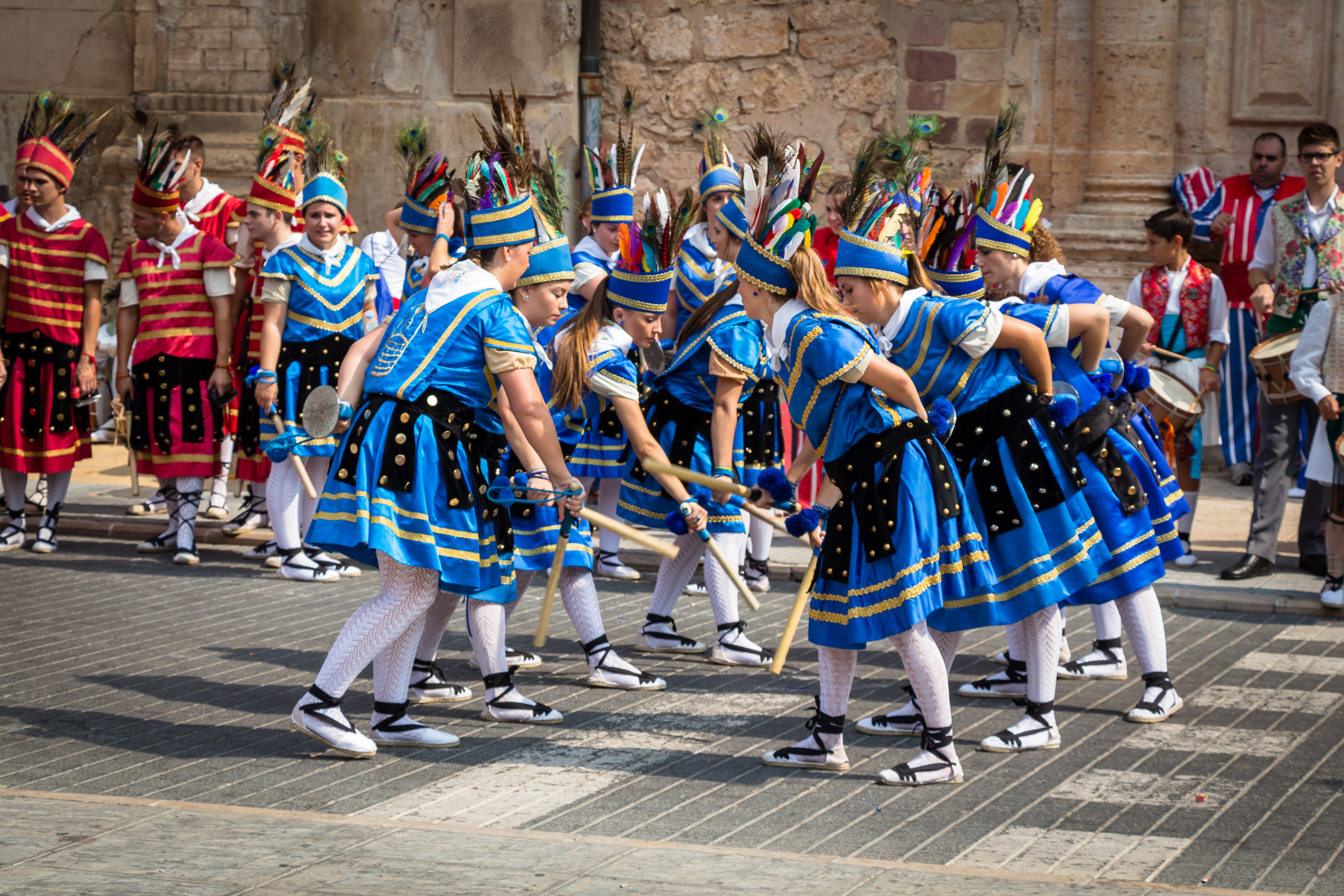
Dance of Bastonets.

Almost 1400 people take part in the traditional ritual acts and dances, which are detailed below:

- “Els Misteris” 5 theatrical representations (boys and girls from 6 to 12 years of age perform theatre pieces).
- “La Muixeranga” (men, women and children of all ages form human towers).
- “Els Bastonets” (the younger generations of men and women perform a traditional Warlike dance).
- “La Carxofa” (young girls perform a traditional Weavers' dance of the former union of her sedates) see artichoke dance below.
- “Els Arquets” (young girls perform a traditional dance).
- “Les Pastoretes” (young boys and girls dressed in traditional costume perform a dance).
- “Les Llauradores” (men and women of all ages dressed in traditional costume perform a dance).
- “Els Tornejants” (the younger generations of men perform a stylised traditional dance).
- "Gigantes y cabezudos" “Giants and Big-Heads”, in Valencian, gegants i cabuts
- “Els Dolçainers” and “Tabaleters de l’Escola de tabal i dolçaina d’Algemesí” (men and women of all ages play a traditional Valencian reed instrument, the dolçaina, and drums).
- “Els Volants” Carriers of the (men and women of all ages).
- Biblical characters (men and women of all ages).
- The “Scolla Cantorum” choir and orchestra (men and women of all ages).
- Bell ringer's guild. (men and women of all ages).
- The Municipal band. (men and women of all ages).

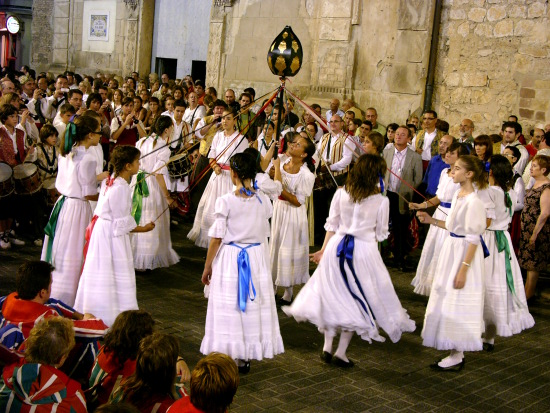
Artichoke dance in Algemesí.

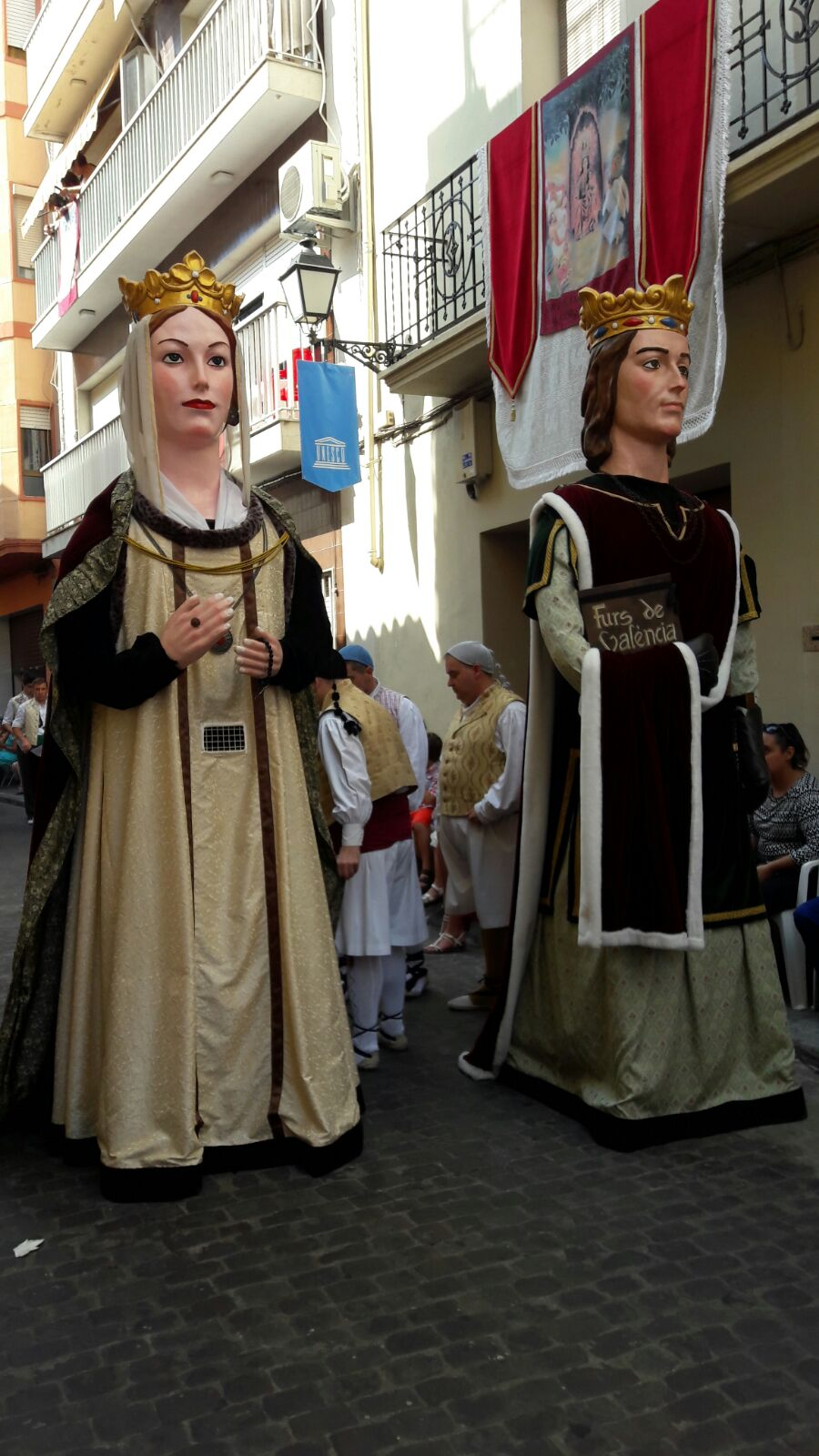
Giants and Big-Heads from Algemesí.

== International awards and recognitions ==
- UNESCO has recognized the ritual, festive and community participation dimension of the Valencian celebration Our Lady of Health as part of the "Masterpieces of the Oral and Intangible Heritage of Humanity".[2]
- Event of Intangible Cultural Interest. Generalitat Valenciana.
- It is also recorded in the Register of Assets of Cultural Interest of the Spanish Ministry of Culture, under code R-I-54-0000151-00000.
- Festivity of Touristic Interest. Spanish Ministry of Industry, Tourism and Commerce.
- Spanish treasure of intangible cultural heritage (ibocc).
- In 2009 the festivity received accreditation from the IBOCC (International Bureau of Cultural Capitals) as one of the 10 Treasures of Spain's Intangible Cultural Heritage.
- Accredited as one of the 7 Valencian marvels (“Fil per Randa”).
- In 2008, the festivity received accreditation as one of the 7 Valencian marvels, in the section “Cultural events and intangible heritage”.
