= Algemesí =

- Town and municipality
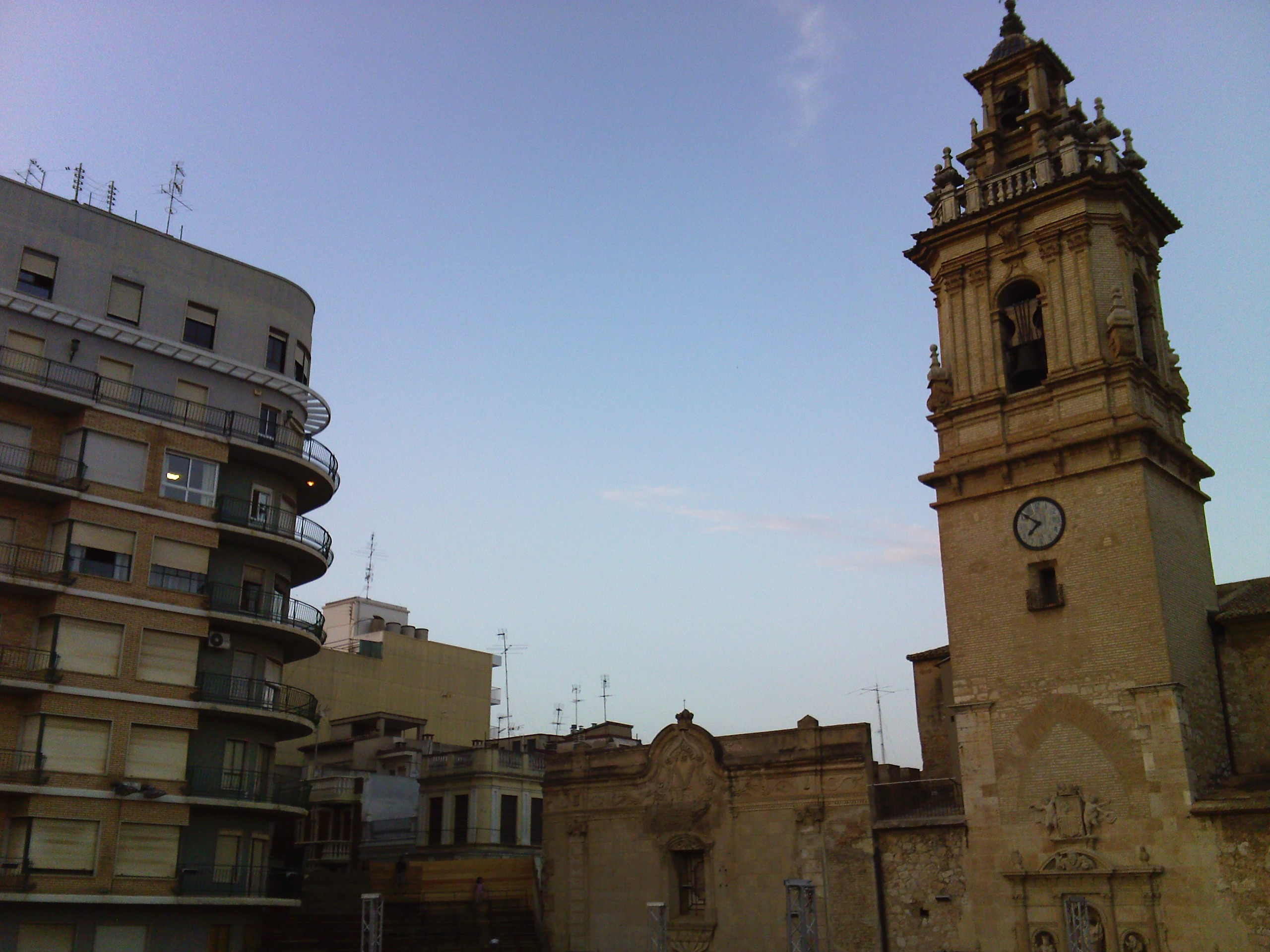

- Coat of arms

- Location in Spain Algemesí (Valencian Community) Algemesí (Spain)
- Coordinates: 39°11′23″N 0°26′16″W
- Country: Spain
- Autonomous community: Valencian Community
- Province: Valencia
- Comarca: Ribera Alta
- Judicial district: Alzira

Government
  - Alcalde (Mayor): Vicent Ramón García i Mont (2007)

Area
  - Total: 41.5 km^{2} (16.0 sq mi)
- Elevation: 17 m (56 ft)

Population (2025-01-01)
  - Total: 28,306
  - Density: 682/km^{2} (1,770/sq mi)
- Demonyms: • algemesinenc, -a (Val.) • algemesinense (Sp.)
- Official language(s): Valencian; Spanish
- Linguistic area: Valencian
- Time zone: UTC+1 (CET)
  - Summer (DST): UTC+2 (CEST)
- Postal code: 46680
- Dialing code: (+34) 9624
- Website: Official website

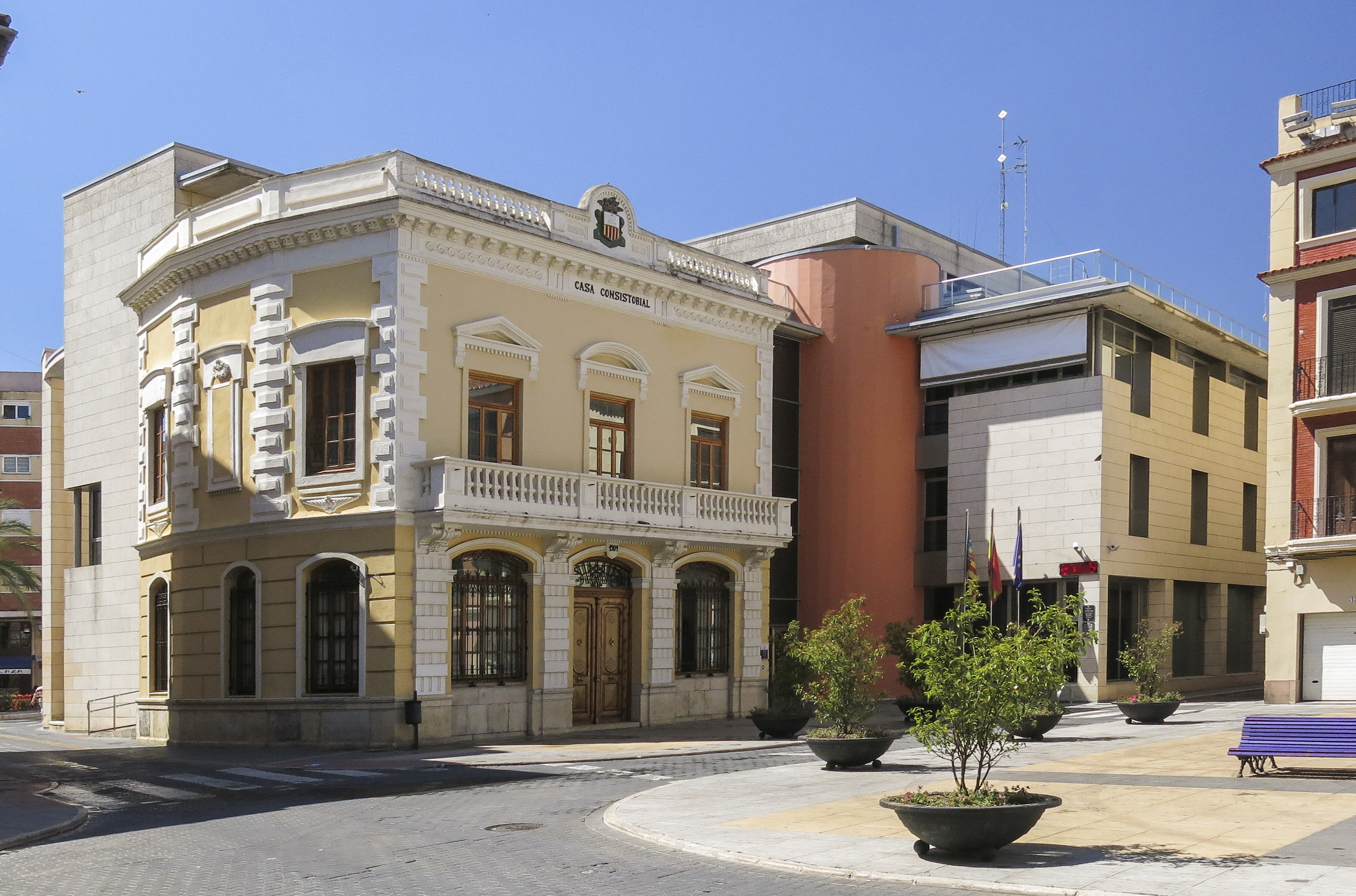
Town hall

Algemesí (Note: Pronunciation of Algemesí: Valencian: [aʎdʒemeˈzi] Spanish: [alxemeˈsi]) is a town and municipality in the comarca of Ribera Alta in the Valencian Community, Spain.

The town of Algemesí is one of the major centres for the production of citruses in Spain, and several cooperatives are based there. This is due to the mild climate and good irrigation coming from the Xúquer river, which passes through the city.

Every September the Festivity of “la Mare de Déu de la Salut” is celebrated, declared an intangible cultural heritage by UNESCO in 2011. The traditional Valencian dance called Muixeranga is originally a part of the festivity.

== Culture ==
The Museum of the Parties of Algemesí, venue of the network of museums of the Valencian Council looks for the consolidation of a major research center about the party. Some files are stored there for the public consultation by photographic media with the most relevant aspects of the popular festivity. Among the expositive elements are "los misterios y martirios, la "muixeranga", "els bastonets", "el ball de la carxofa i arquets", "les pastoretes", "el bolero", "els tornejants", "els volants", "la Mare de Deu de la Salut" y "la música".

The Societat Musical d'Algemesí (the Musical Society of Algemesí)

=== Events ===
- La Mare de Déu de la Salut Festival The Festivity of “la Mare de Déu de la Salut” presents a series of traditions which from 1247 through to 1905 (date of the most recent addition), were transmitted from generation to generation until they came to form what can now be considered a homage to cultural tradition. This event takes place in the historical parts of the city of Algemesí on the 7th and 8 September each year. Of special note is the great participation and involvement of the townsfolk of all ages in the event, through the many associations formed to meet the needs of the traditions and ritual acts that make up the festivity. The guilds, from which the age-old dances were born, underwent many changes with the industrial revolution in the late 19th century, providing their members with a window onto other social and professional environments. These days, the ritual acts and traditions which call for a specific number of participants all have waiting lists. Positions on these lists are hereditary. The number of people joining in the dances which are open to any number of participants is growing constantly.

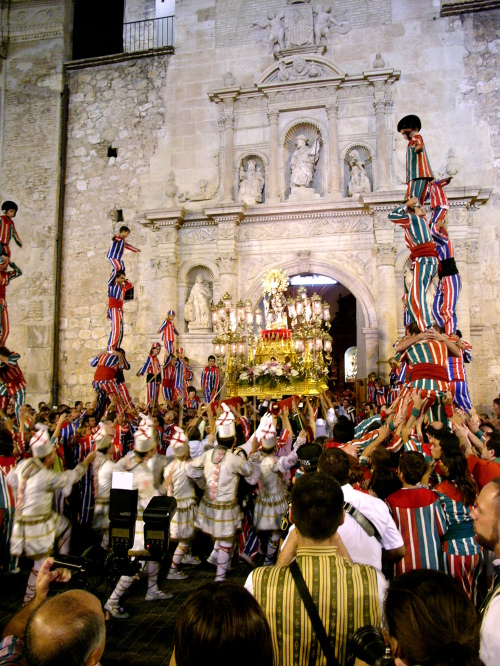
Festivity of 'la Mare de Déu de la Salut' of Algemesí.

RECOGNITIONS

- UNESCO has recognized the ritual, festive and community participation dimension of the Valencian celebration Our Lady of Health as part of the "intangible heritage of humanity".
- Event of Intangible Cultural Interest. Generalitat Valenciana.
- It is also recorded in the Register of Assets of Cultural Interest of the Spanish Ministry of Culture, under code R-I-54-0000151-00000.
- Festivity of Touristic Interest. Spanish Ministry of Industry, Tourism and Commerce.
- Spanish treasure of intangible cultural heritage.
- In 2009 the festivity received accreditation from the IBOCC (International Bureau of Cultural Capitals) as one of the 10 Treasures of Spain's Intangible Cultural Heritage.
- Accredited as one of the 7 Valencian marvels (“Fil per Randa”).
- In 2008, the festivity received accreditation as one of the 7 Valencian marvels, in the section “Cultural events and intangible heritage”.
- Taurine week: Every year in late September in the town is built a wood rectangular bullring where the Fair of calves (the oldest and most important bullfighting and bullfighting on horse. The bullfighting ring is divided into 4 “cadafals” (areas) that come to auction and its cost is the basis of the budget of the Party, bullfights and evening performances. The bullring is a unique construction: each 9 September the “peñas” as are known the associations built the bullring just as it was done in 1943, with wood, nails and strings as raw materials. Each “peña” built its own “cadafal>” parallel to the façade of the Major Square, so all the 29 “cadafals” form the rectangular square. The exhibition consists on eight runs and afternoon bullfightings on horseback. The schedule is as follows: during the morning they have the “correbous” from the pens to the square. After lunch, at the square of Salvador Castell, where the “peñas” have their booths. In the afternoon, more runs and then they have dinner and nightly entertainment in the bullfighting ring.

== International relations ==
=== Twin towns – Sister cities ===
Algemesí is twinned with:

- Riom, France
- Gangneung, South Korea

== Climate ==
Climate data for Algemesí (data from 1964-1970, altitude: 18m)
Month	Jan	Feb	Mar	Apr	May	Jun	Jul	Aug	Sep	Oct	Nov	Dec	Year
Mean daily maximum °C (°F)	16.2 (61.2)	16.9 (62.4)	19.3 (66.7)	21.7 (71.1)	25.2 (77.4)	27.8 (82.0)	30.1 (86.2)	31.0 (87.8)	29.5 (85.1)	24.5 (76.1)	19.5 (67.1)	16.2 (61.2)	23.2 (73.8)
Daily mean °C (°F)	10.2 (50.4)	10.6 (51.1)	12.4 (54.3)	14.8 (58.6)	18.1 (64.6)	21.3 (70.3)	24.0 (75.2)	24.8 (76.6)	22.8 (73.0)	18.4 (65.1)	13.4 (56.1)	10.0 (50.0)	16.7 (62.1)
Mean daily minimum °C (°F)	4.3 (39.7)	4.4 (39.9)	5.4 (41.7)	8.0 (46.4)	11.0 (51.8)	14.8 (58.6)	17.9 (64.2)	18.7 (65.7)	16.2 (61.2)	12.4 (54.3)	7.2 (45.0)	3.7 (38.7)	10.3 (50.5)
Average precipitation mm (inches)	45 (1.8)	43 (1.7)	41 (1.6)	37 (1.5)	45 (1.8)	40 (1.6)	6 (0.2)	19 (0.7)	41 (1.6)	139 (5.5)	62 (2.4)	42 (1.7)	560 (22.0)
Source: Sistema de Clasificación Bioclimática Mundial

== See also ==
- List of municipalities in Valencia
