= Acrobalance =

Acrobatic skill

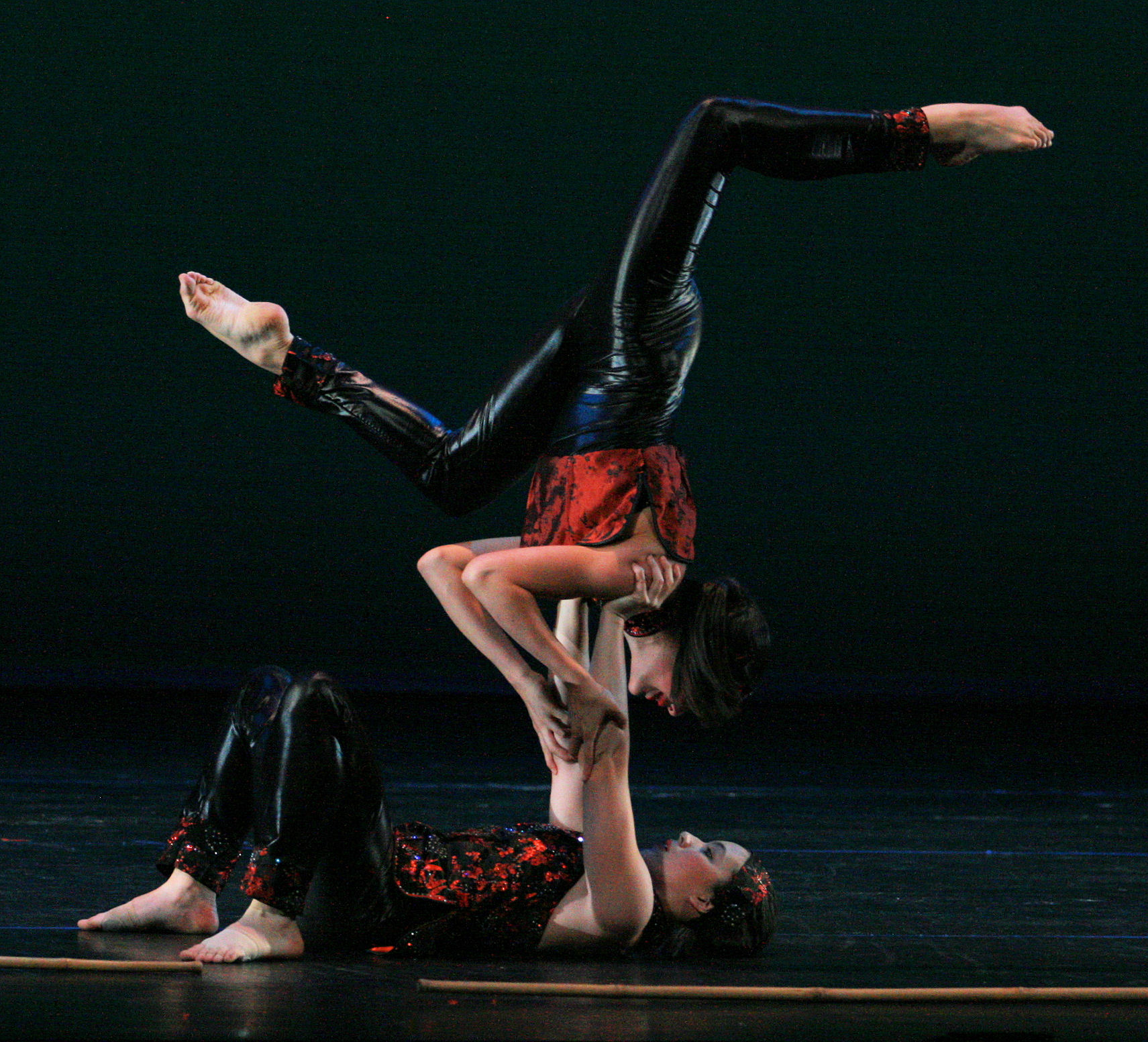
Acro dancers perform a stag shoulder stand.

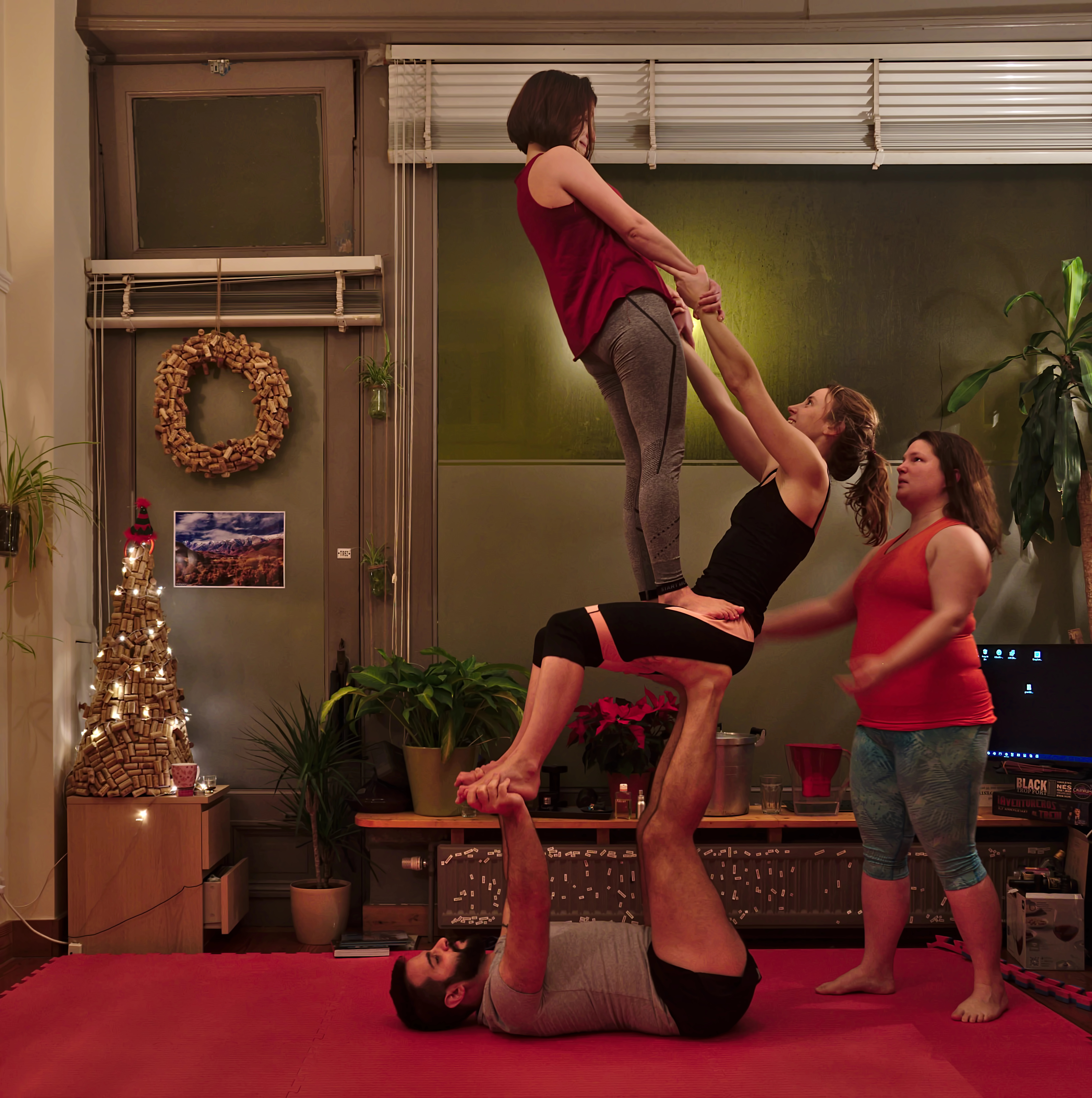
Three people and a spotter performing a pyramid thighstand on throne

Acrobalance is a floor-based acrobatic art that involves balances, lifts and creating shapes performed in pairs or groups. A performer on the ground doing the lifting and supporting in an acrobalance formation is often called the base, while a performer being lifted or tossed can be referred to as the flyer (or flier). Formats include male/female duo, trio, female/female, and other variations.

Acrobalance acts require a high degree of care, coordination, proprioceptive awareness, and mutual trust from the performers in order to avoid injury; they are often set to music and performed as part of circuses. Acrobalance performances can now also be seen on a wide variety of shows such as street performances, incorporated into children's theater and as part of modern dance performances.

== Technique ==
Acrobalance is the combination of the two athletic art forms:

- Adagio: consists of partner lifts, often performed by a strong base and a lighter flier, where the base lifts the flier in many different poses and positions. Many forms of adagio also incorporate throws and tosses; the base may throw the flier into somersaults, layouts, and other acrobatic maneuvers. Many styles of dance incorporate some form of adagio (as dance lifts), including ballet (in pas de deux), jazz, and lyrical. Ice skaters also perform lifts that belong to the adagio art. Whenever a person lifts another up in different artistic poses, or performs tosses where the bottom mounter catches the top mounter again, it is considered adagio.
- Hand balancing: performance of acrobatic body shape changing movements, or stationary poses, or both, while balanced on and supported entirely by one's hands or arms. It is performed by acro dancers, circus performers, gymnasts, and sports acrobats. Hand balancing may be performed by partners or individuals. In partner hand balancing, a strong bottom mounter supports the top mounter in handstands, planches and other acrobatic poses. In solo hand balancing, a single artist performs handstands, one-hand stands, planches and other equilibristic maneuvers, usually on top of pommels, blocks or other apparatuses.

== Derivatives and closely related formats ==
Acrobalance is often understood within the broader term Acro -- a hybrid format that involves a similar setup of 2 or more people, with base, flyer and spotter(s).

Acro has its roots in circus, but draws on "acrobatic gymnastics, adagio, acro yoga, cheerleading, swing dance aerials" and "other acro styles".

It is often practised alongside other forms of acrobatics and partner exercise, such as at the London Acro Convention, which includes "acro yoga, partner acrobatics, L-basing and standing dynamics, flying therapeutics, handstands, tumbling and more".

Acrobalance is therefore part of a spectrum of acro formats that draw on a broad range of influences and are mutually reinforcing.

== Bibliography ==
- Cosgrove, Duncan (2020). Beginning Acro. Duncan Cosgrove. ISBN 1527282066.

== See also ==
- Acrobatic gymnastics
- Human pyramid
- Castell
- Human tower (gymnastic formation)
- Acroyoga
