= Human tower (gymnastic formation) =

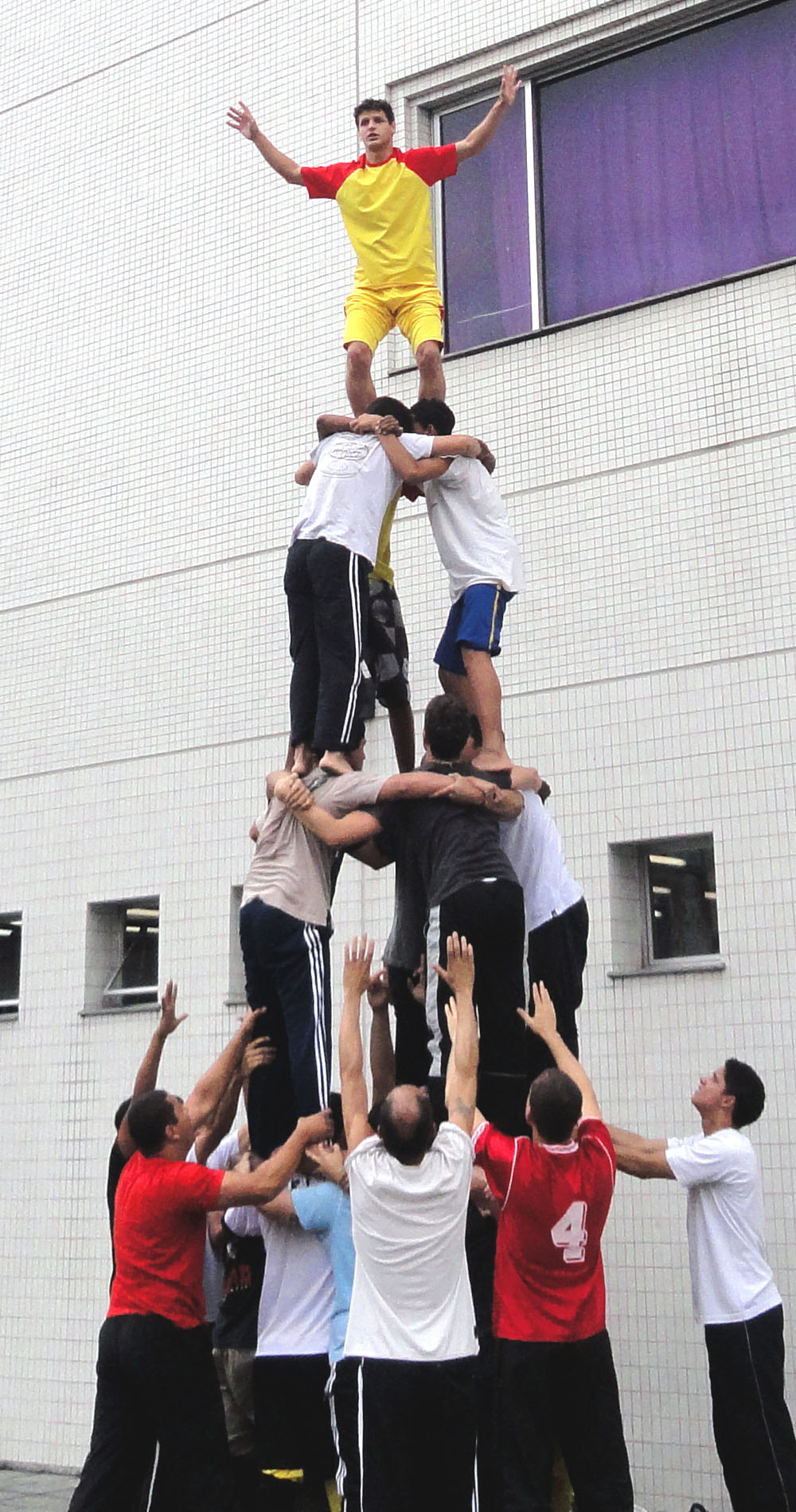
Four layers' human tower which almost stands-up. A scene during the development of the gymnastic formation squadron of the Brazil SGI Young Men's Division of Rio de Janeiro in October, 2011

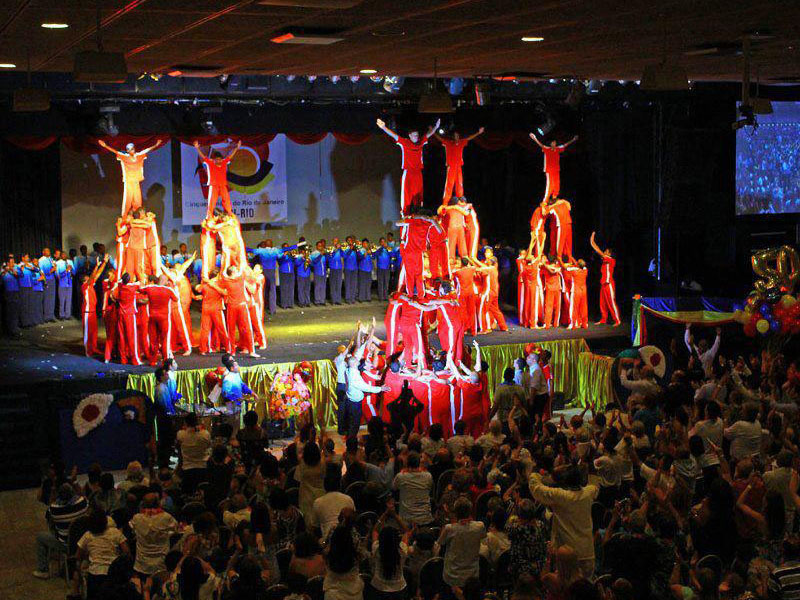
Four layers' human tower and 4 units of three layers' ones. The performance of the Brazil SGI Young Men's Division team of Rio de Janeiro at Ribalta Theater, on October 30, 2011

Human tower is a performance variation of gymnastic formation. Together with the human pyramid, it is exhibited frequently at the climax of the performance. In gymnastics, human tower is the highest and largest mounting. On the shoulder of the components of the base layer, put the feet of components of the second floor. In the same way, the components of higher floors are accumulated. The mounting is performed in sitting postulate. After the conclusion of the mounting, the tower stands up from lower floor to upper ones.

As a general term, the expression human tower is often confused with human pyramid. This item shows the human tower of gymnastic formation.

== See also ==
- Castell
- Muixeranga
- Human pyramid
