= Gymnastic formation =

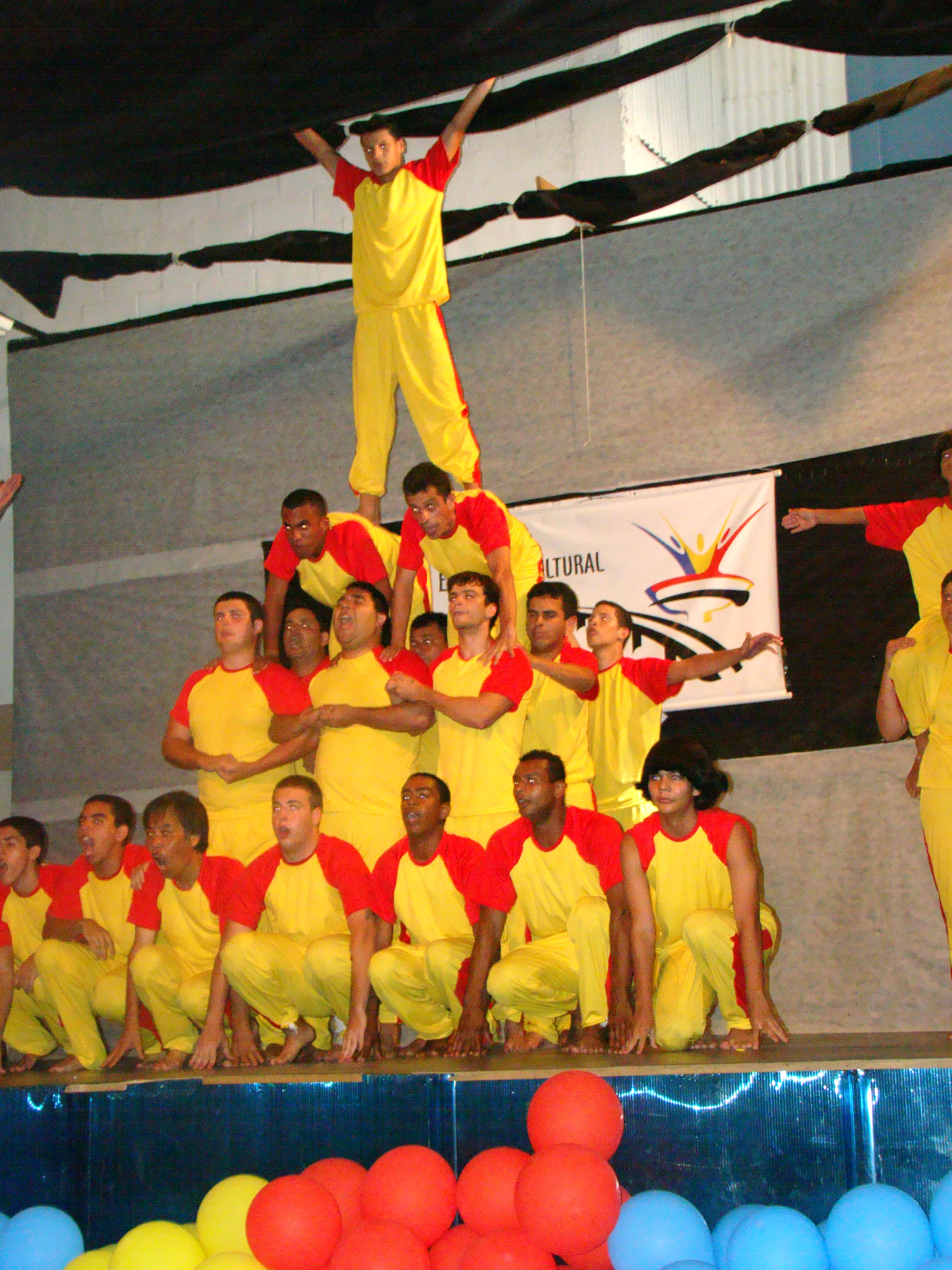
Gymnastic formation performance by the Brazil SGI members, Niterói, State of Rio de Janeiro, in October, 2009.

Gymnastic formation is a collective art based on gymnastics expressed by 30 to 5000 figurants using only human bodies without instruments. It is commonly presented in Japanese schools as a part of physical education curriculum. The expression of the collective beauty based on force, passion, and union of young men is much more important than the individual expression. It is a modality of mass game.

In this moment, there is no unified English expression. In the United States of America, journalists sometimes use the expression “mass gymnastics” especially to represent annual festival of the North Korea. However, this expression not always includes mounting, and therefore, it meaning is similar to mass game. In the other English speaking countries, such as Malaysia, it is called “gymnastic formation”. In Japan, it is called "kumi-taisô", which means mounting gymnastics.

== History ==
Basic performances of gymnastic formation are seen at the wall painting of ancient Egypt and ceramic art of ancient China. In the Middle Age of Europe, it was exhibited in Italy on the festivities. In the 19th century, gymnastic formation was performed in Germany. In the beginning of the 20th century, in the United States of America, some young women's groups performed it. In Czechoslovakia (country name of that time), large-scale gymnastic formation of thousands of figurants was exhibited up to 1985. In Japan, gymnastic formation of hundreds of participants, mostly males, is performed up to the present in annual sports festivals of schools and colleges, and is a standard part of the Soka Gakkai & Soka Gakkai International athletic and cultural activities as part of their repertoie. Up to the end of the 20th century, gymnastic formation was practiced in many organizations around the world. However, in the 21st century large-scale gymnastics became less exhibited. Today, it is seem in limited countries and territories, such as Hong Kong, Malaysia, Singapore, Brazil, Philippines, and North Korea. The former five are in civil events (with majority being Soka events) and the latter is a national governmental event.

== Performance ==
Gymnastic formation has general objective of demonstration of force, passion, and union of the participants and not a modality to dispute championship. General flow is from small-light mounting to large-heavy mounting. The performance of the NGOs, such as the Soka Gakkai International (SGI), is widely variable, such as, bi-dimensional wave, sky rocket, windmill, walking wall, walking pyramid, catapult, instantaneous stand-up pyramid, instantaneous stand-up tower, three-layers' plane tower, four-layers' tower, and rarely five-layers' tower. The six-layers' tower that stood up in Osaka, Japan, in 1982 was indexed on the Guinness Book.

== United States ==
In United States, gymnastic formation are mainly performed as part of cheerleading. School or college cheerleading are performed students. Club cheerleading and professional cheerleading are performed by people belonging to the club or team.

== Japan ==
It is called "kumi-taisô". In Japanese schools, gymnastic formation are performed as part of physical education events. Toward that end, they practice in PE classes. Students wear gym clothes designated by the school to participate.

== Gallery ==
SGI
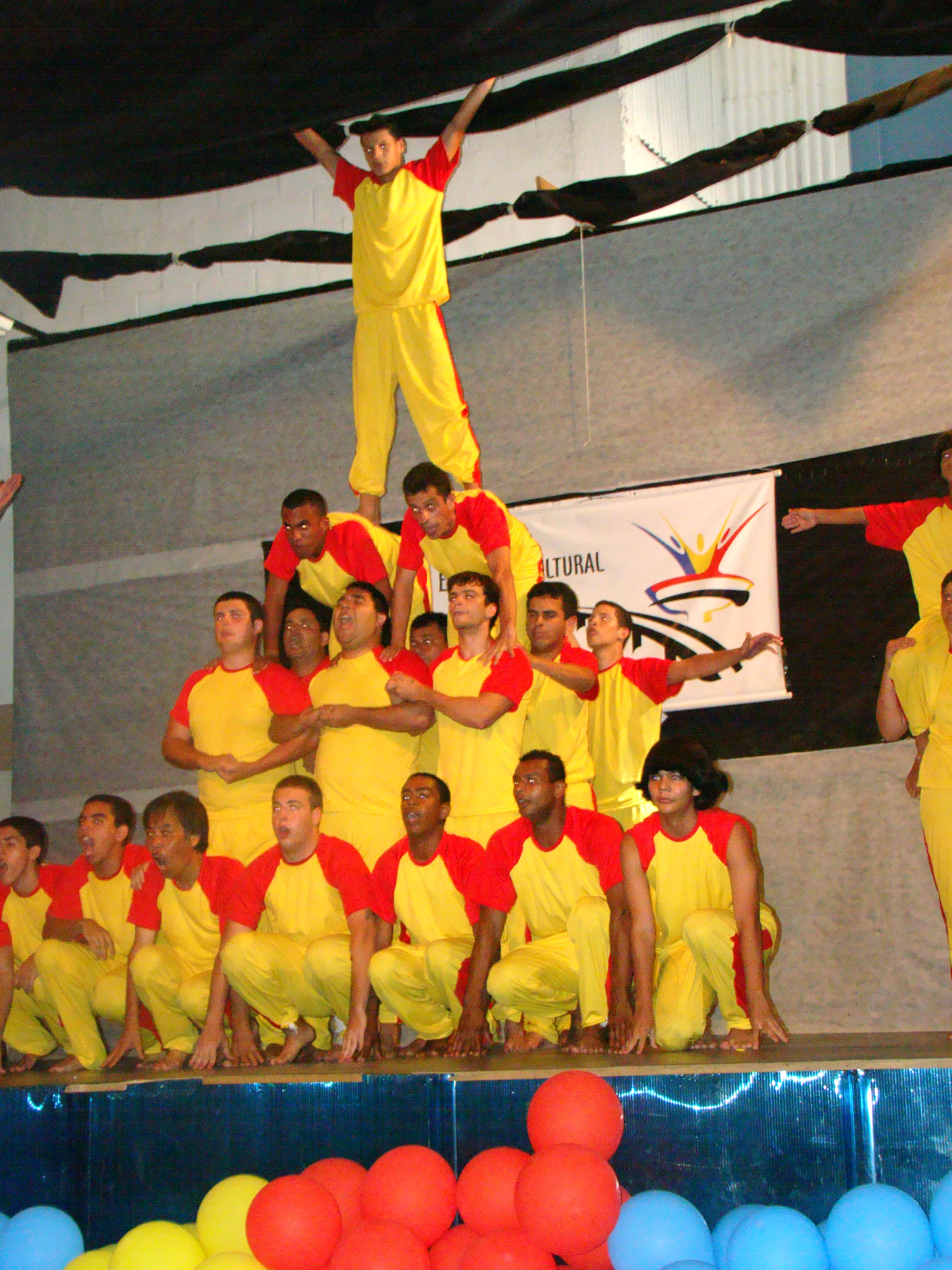
Gymnastic formation performance by the Brazil SGI members, Niterói, State of Rio de Janeiro, in October, 2009.

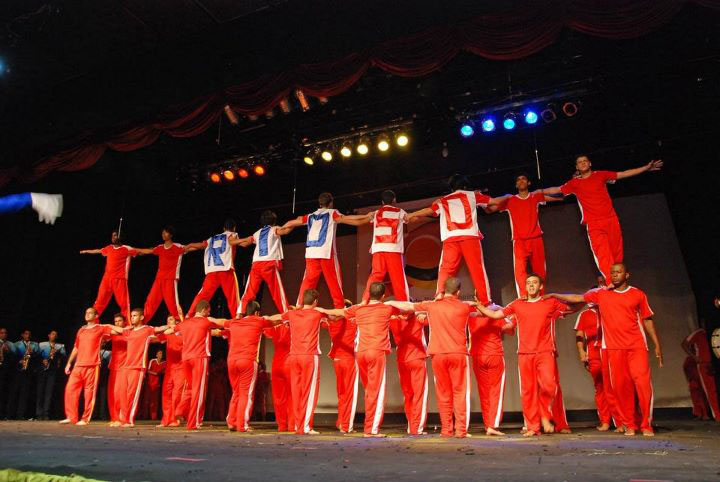
Walking wall. Performance of the Brazil SGI team at Rio de Janeiro, on October 30, 2011

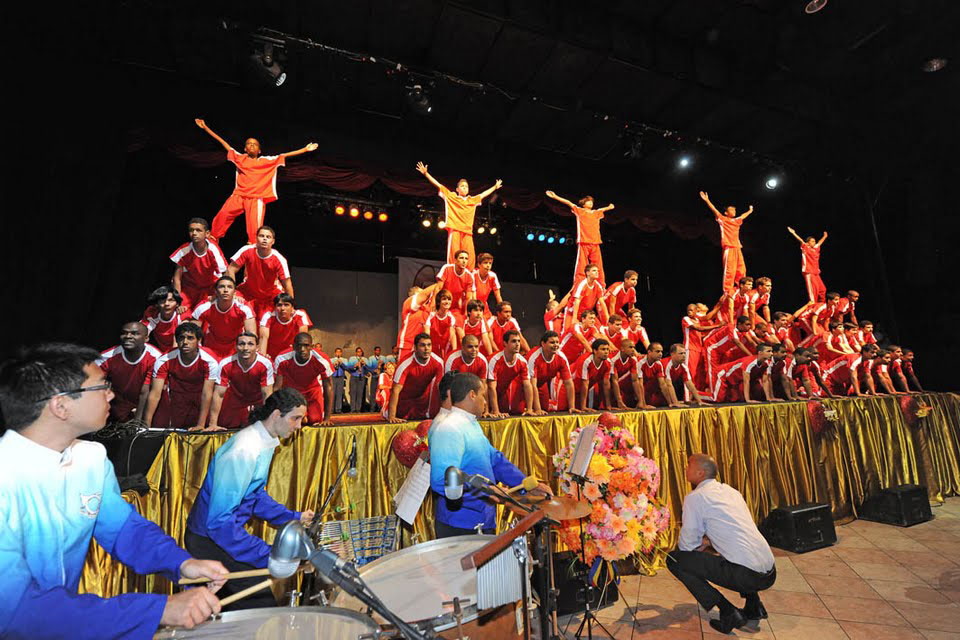
5 units of four layers' instantaneous standing-up pyramid. Performance of the Brazil, SGI team at Rio de Janeiro, on October 30, 2011.

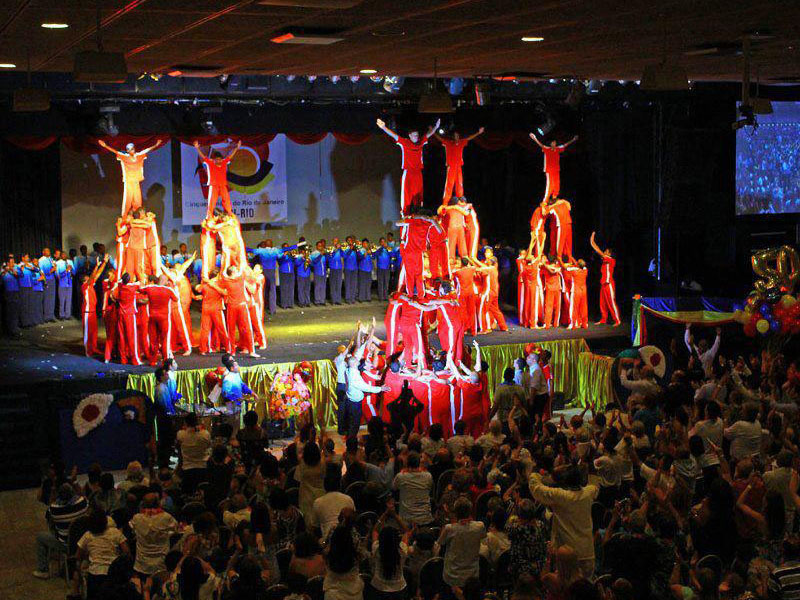
4 units of three layers' towers and 1 unit of four layers' tower by the Brazil SGI team at Rio de Janeiro, on October 30, 2011.
United States
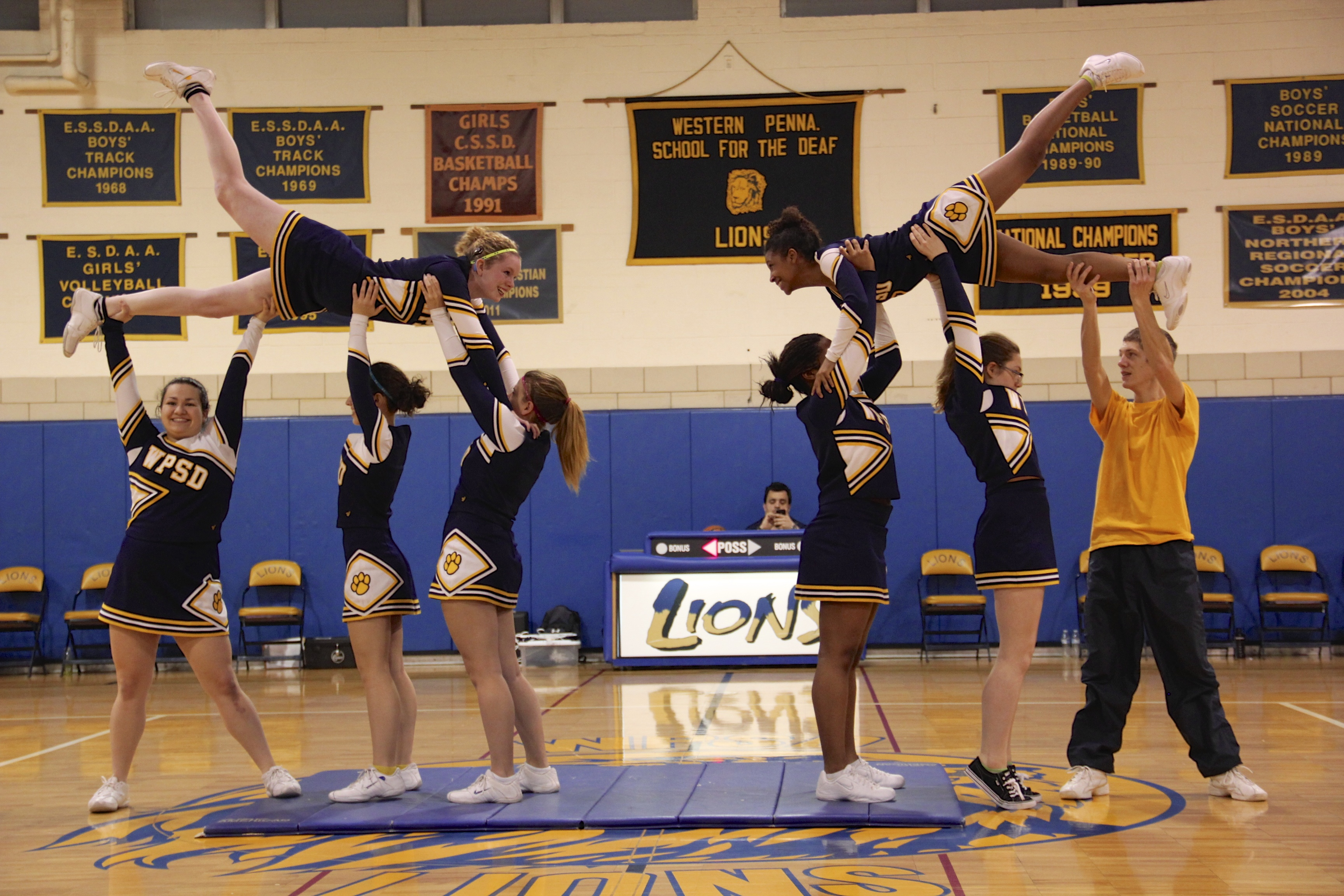
Gymnastics formation by cheerleaders at school in United States.

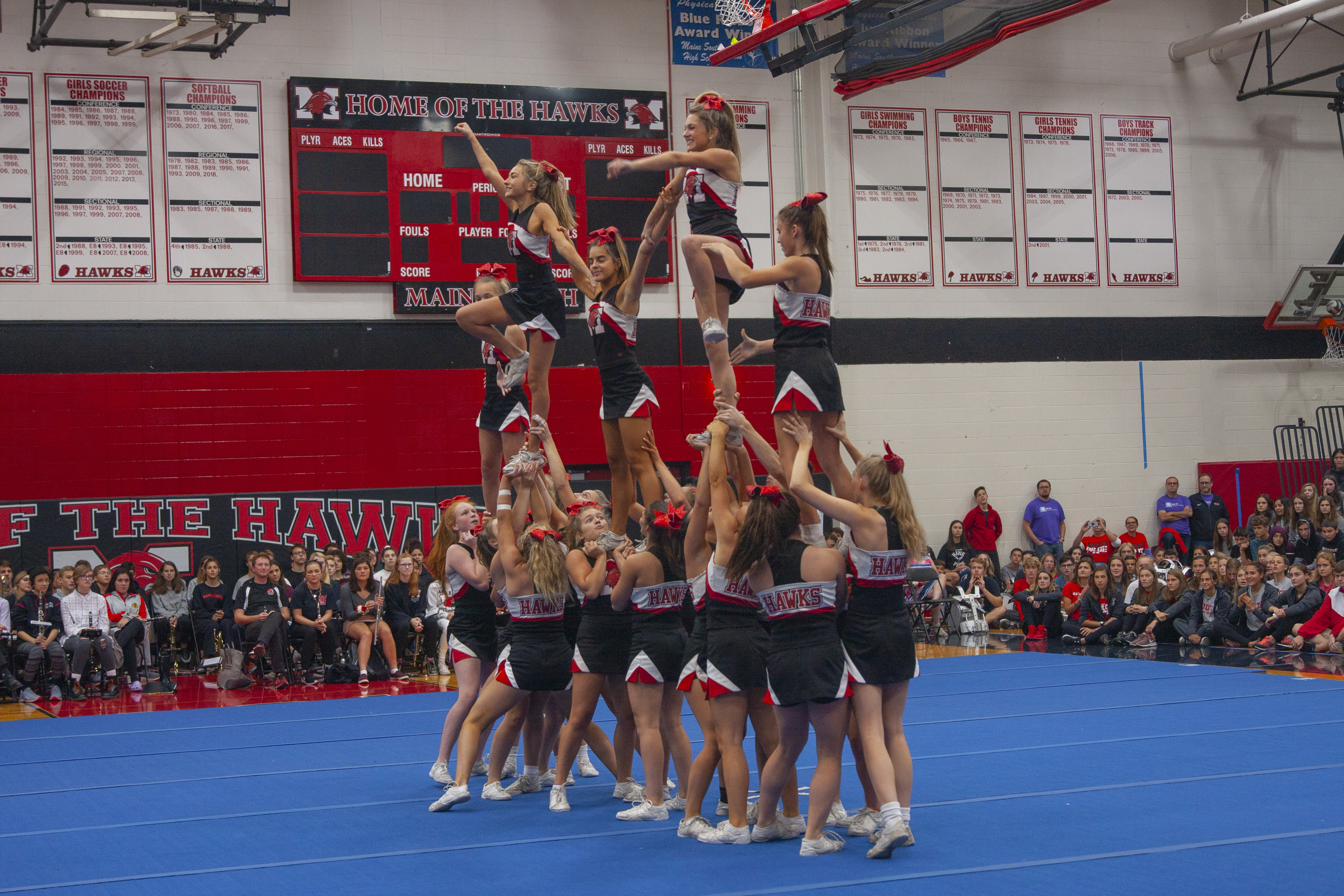
Gymnastics performed as part of cheerleading at high school in United States.
Japan
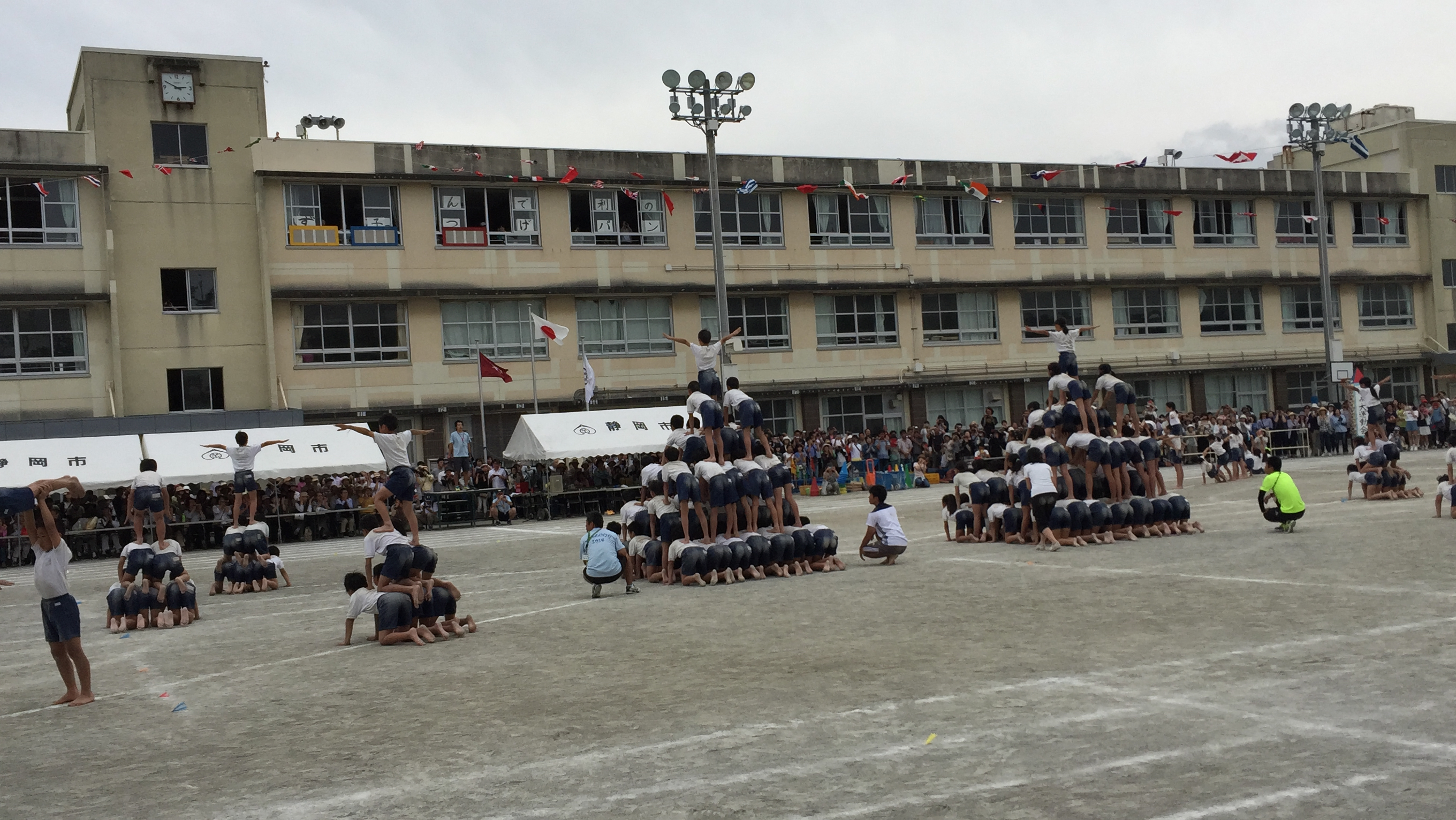
Gymnastics performed at a Field Day at a public elementary school in Japan

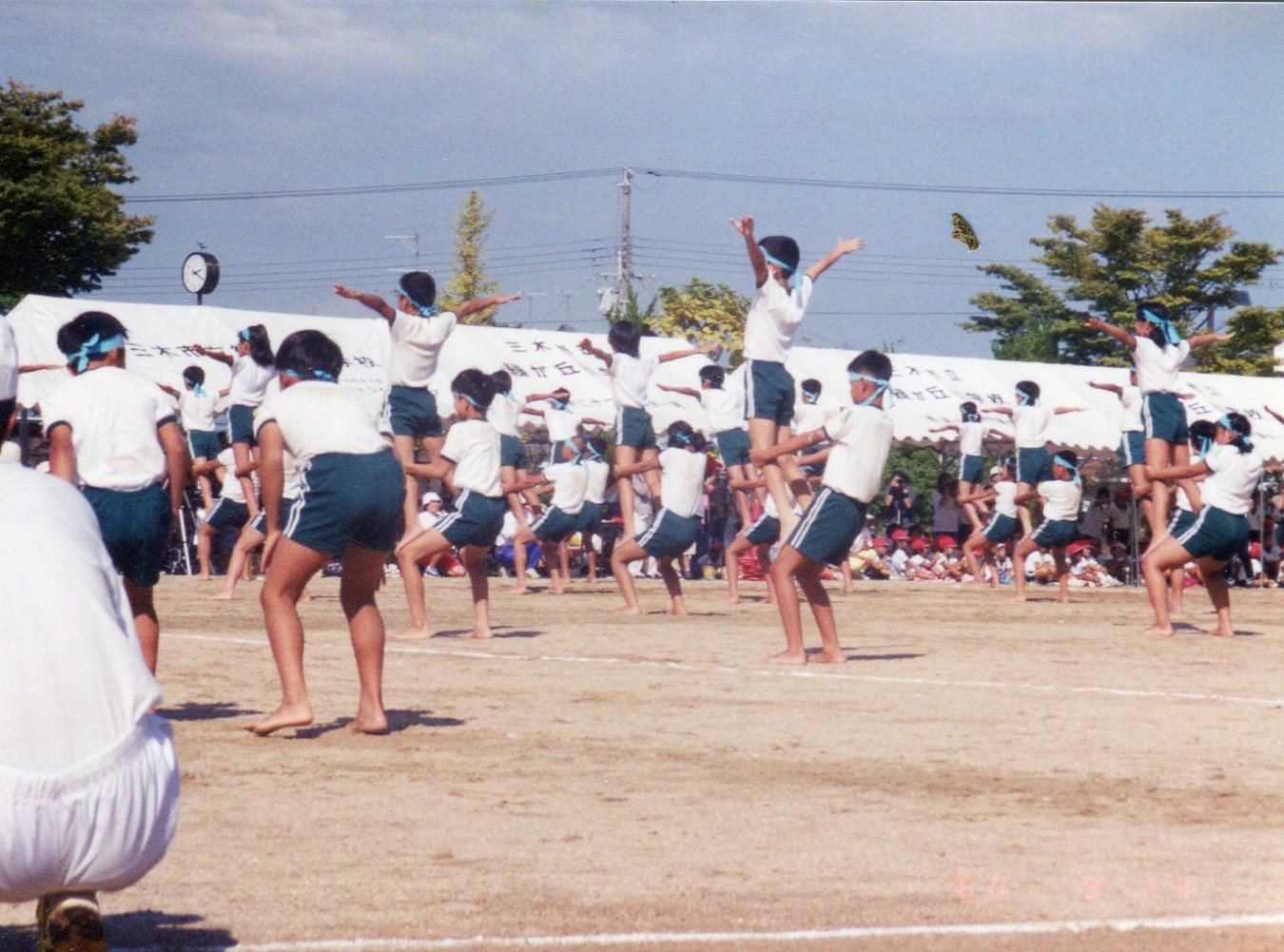
Gymnastics performed by elementary school students in Japan
Brazil
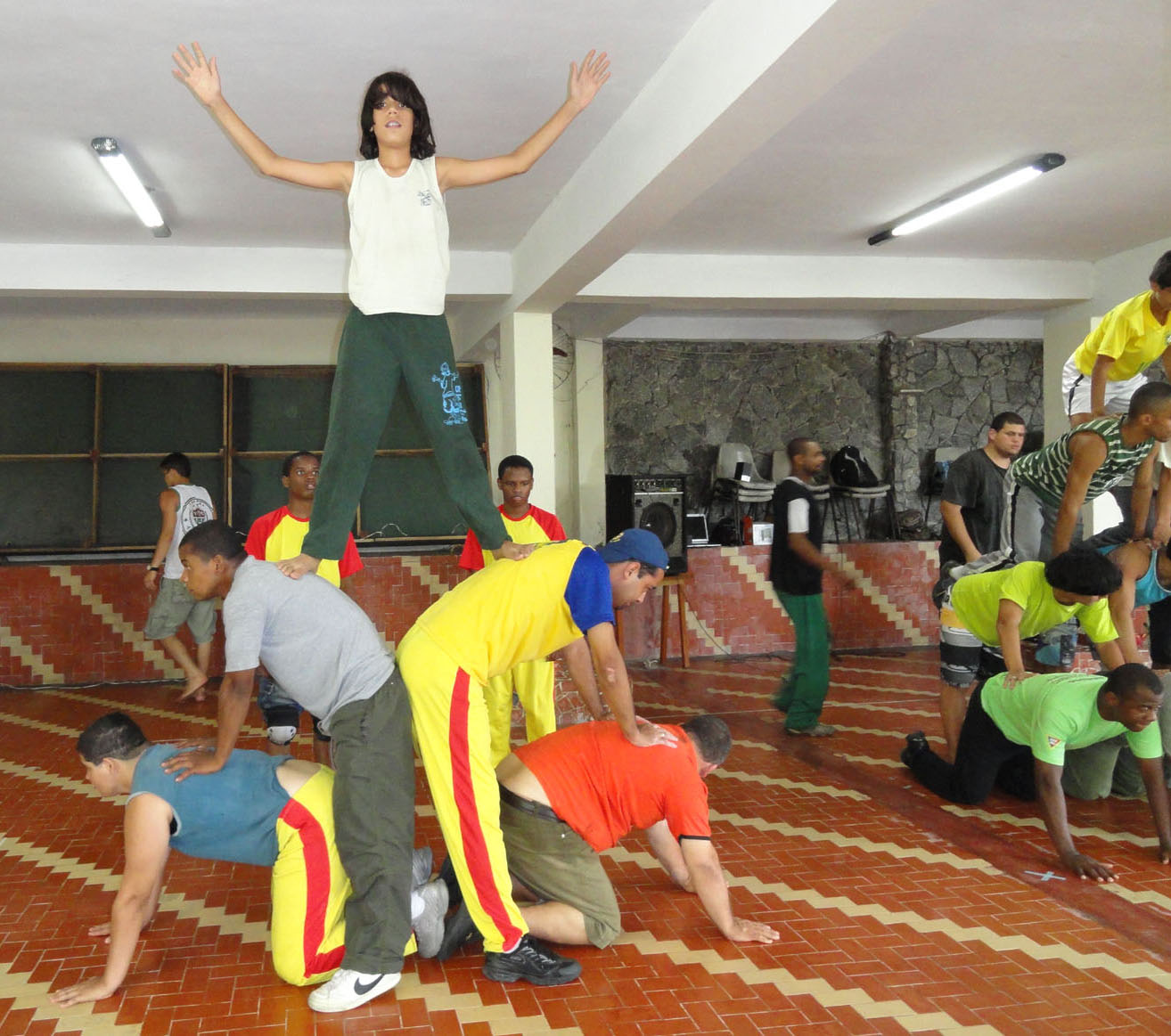
Training of the Formation 2, at Niteroi, State of Rio de Janeiro, Brazil in November, 2010.

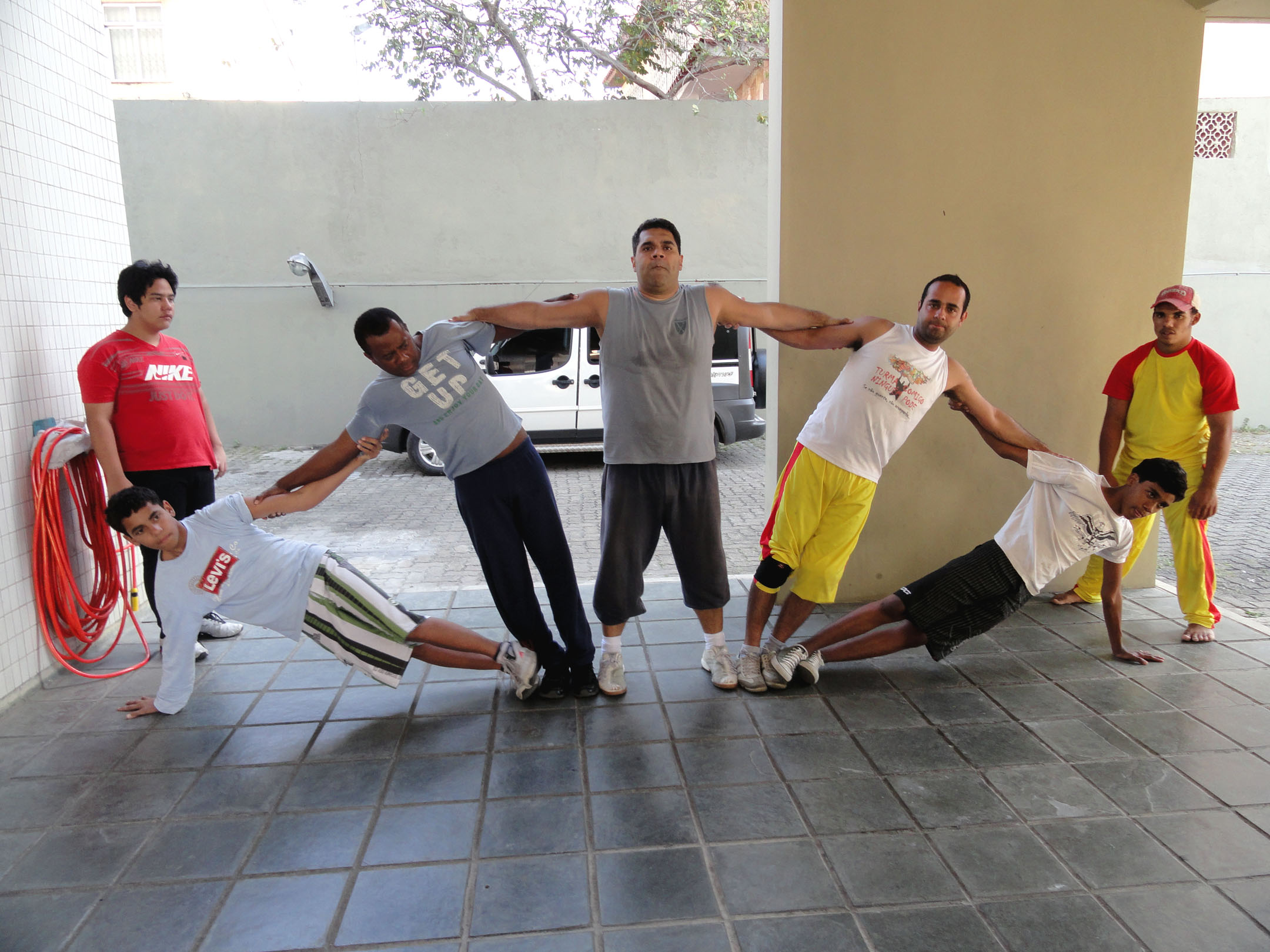
5 men's fan, during the training on September 4, 2011, at Rio de Janeiro, Brazil.

== Bibliographic references ==
- Yasuichi Hamada, 1996. Illustrated gymnastic formation. Daishûkan Edition, 305p. ISBN 978-4-469-26349-7 (in Japanese, 浜田靖一 『イラストで見る組体操・組立体操』)
- Yasuich Hamada, 1998. Illustrated and photographed mass games. Daishukan Edition, 268p. ISBN 4-469-26384-2 (in Japanese, 浜田靖一 『イラストと写真で見るマスゲーム』)
- Gymnastic Formation-related Injury to Children in Physical Education (※PDF) Journal of Nippon Medical School. Accepted, September 27, 2015
- A scientific investigation of risk in large gymnastic formations(※PDF) Yutaka Nishiyama January-15 2017 NAID:120005972587

== See also ==
- Castells, human towers built in Catalonia
- Govinda sport, human towers built in India
