= Dahi Handi =

Event and team sport during the Hindu festival Gokulashtami

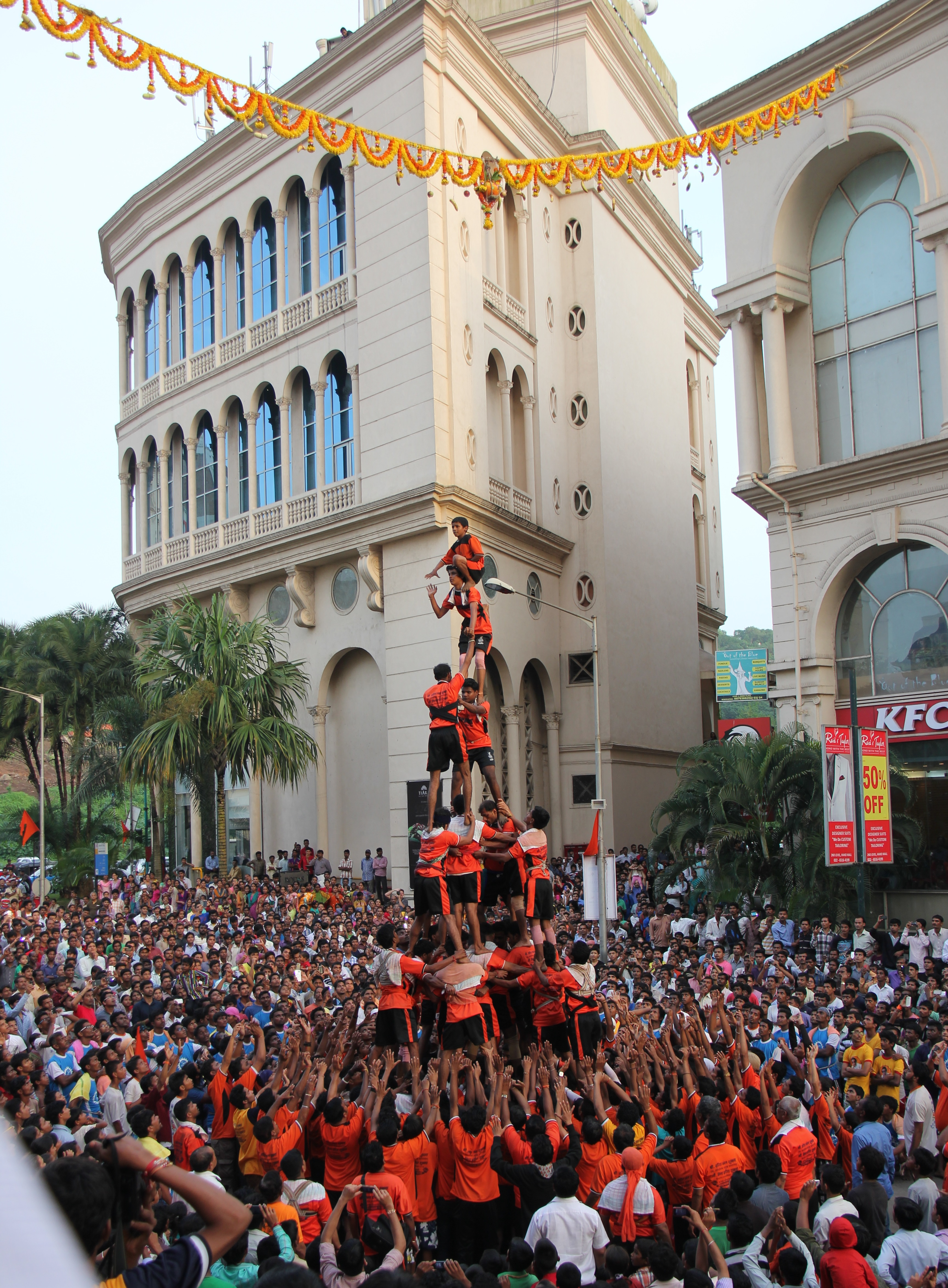
- Govindas forming a human pyramid to reach the Dahi Handi (earthen pot) in Hiranandani Gardens
- Also called: Utlotsavam, Sikhyotsavam
- Observed by: Hindus
- Type: Religious
- Celebrations: 1 day
- Observances: Fasting, praying, making a human pyramid and breaking an earthen pot filled with curd tied at a convenient/difficult height
- Date: Shravan, Krishna Paksha, Navami
- Related to: Krishna

Dahi Handi (also known as Gopal Kala or Utlotsavam) is an entertainment and competitive event associated with Krishna Janmashtami, the Hindu festival celebrating the birth of Krishna.

During the event, which takes place during August or September on the day after Krishna Janmashtami. It involves communities hanging a clay pot filled with yogurt (dahi), butter, or another milk-based food at a convenient or tall height. Young men and women form teams, make a human pyramid, and attempt to reach or break the pot. As they do so, people surround them, sing, play music, and cheer them on. It is a public spectacle, and an old tradition. More recently, Dahi Handi was lavished with media coverage, prize money and commercial sponsorships. The event is based on the legend of the god Krishna along with his friends mischievously stealing butter and other curd from neighbouring homes in Gokul as a child. He is also called Makhan chor or butter thief. The neighbours would try to avert his mischief by hanging the pots high out of his reach, but Krishna would find creative ways to reach them.

== Significance and description ==
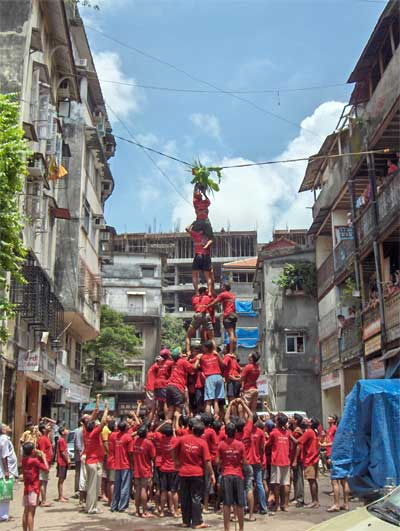
Govinda pathaks forming a human tower to break the Dahi handi

In Maharastra, Janmashtami is celebrated as Dahi Handi (dahi: curd, handi: earthen pot) It is organized roughly every August. The festival Gokulashtami, known as Krishna Janmashtami in the rest of the country, is the celebration of Krishna's birth and Dahi Handi is part of it. The event involves making a human pyramid and breaking an earthen pot filled with milk, curd, butter, fruits and water which is hung at a convenient height, thus imitating the actions of child Krishna. Sometimes the prize money is added to the pot instead.

The terms govinda (also another name of Krishna) or govinda pathak are used to refer to the people who participate in forming this human pyramid. They practise in groups weeks before the actual event. These groups are called mandals and they go around the local areas, attempting to break as many pots as possible during the event. Pyramid formation needs coordination and focus; the lowest layers consist of the most people, preferably sturdy, while the middle layer players need to pay attention to those below as well as those standing on their shoulders. The outer layer individuals need to focus on maintaining balance. As lighter people are needed higher up, the topmost layer usually has a single child. Breaking the pot usually ends up with the contents spilling over the participants. Traditionally, spectators throw water on the participants to deter them and people chant in Marathi "Ala re ala, Govinda ala" (govindas have arrived). The pyramid formation is often accompanied by crowds, music and dancing.

In Andhra Pradesh and Telangana this festival is celebrated as Utlotsavam (In Telugu Utti: a fibrous network sling to hang pots and Utsavam: Festival). At the famous Tirupati Venkateswara Temple, this ancient sport is celebrated with great fervor on navami (the day after krishna janmastami). The processional deities of Sri Krishna Swamy and Sri Malayappa Swamy are taken in a procession around the temple to the place just in-front of temple where Utlotsavam is performed. The sport is played in front of the deities by local youth to try and win the prize money which is tied to the end of a 25 foot long wooden post, smeared with sticky and other oily substances.

== Celebration and economics ==
The participants form a pyramid consisting usually below 9-tiers, and are given three attempts to break the earthen pot. Every year thousands of people and hundreds of govinda teams gather at Pune, Mumbai and Thane's Dahi Handi events. As of 2011, the prize money for the events usually range between ₹1 lakh (US$1,000)–₹12 lakh (US$12,000) depending on the organizers and its sponsors. Each year, the prizes and scale of the celebrations increase due to the participation of political parties and commercialisation.

Local and state political parties like the Nationalist Congress Party (NCP), Shiv Sena and Maharashtra Navnirman Sena (MNS), are active during this event, with each offering their own prize money. Each party sponsors its own set of mandals. Their involvement has increased in the 2000s, thereby increasing competition and prize money. Thus, numerous teams compete against each other in successive events for the prizes throughout the city. Actors from Bollywood, Marathi actors and singers take part in this event. Some mandals even incorporated social messages like female foeticide or about the environment into their act; the Shiv Sena and MNS focus on Marathi culture. Some years, Castellers from Catalonia also take part in the competition.

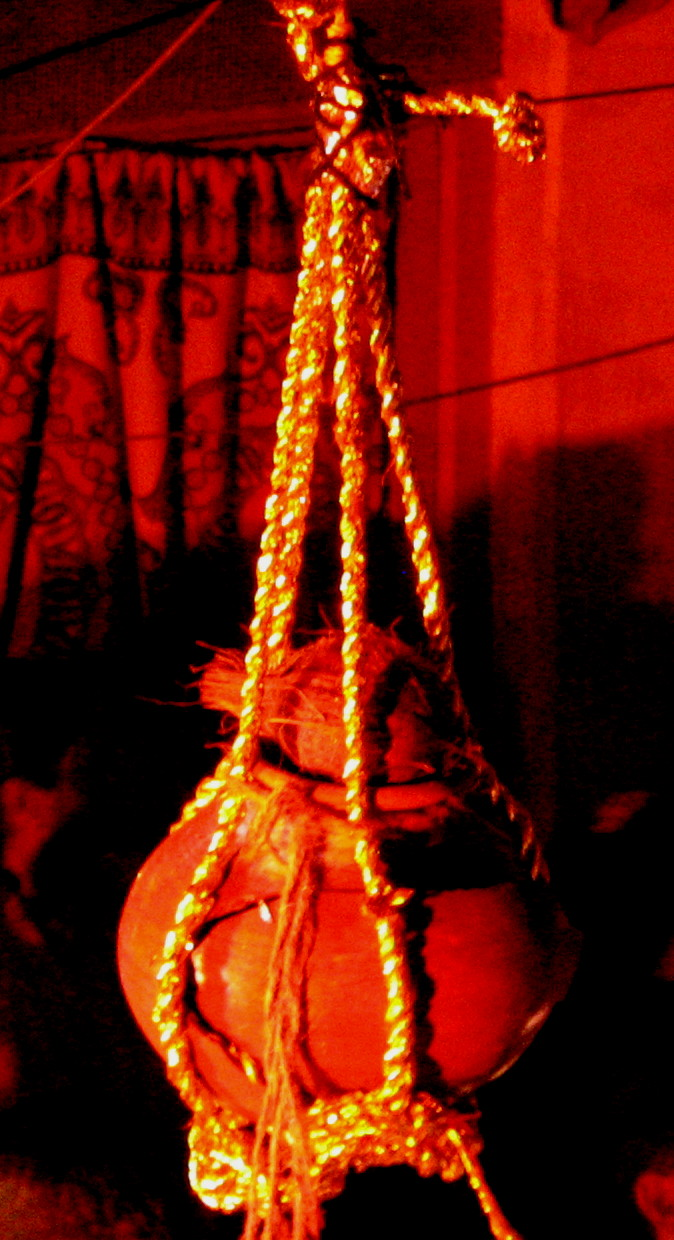
A Dahi Handi, tied up high for the Hindu festival of Janmashtmi Krishna.

In 2012, a mandal called Jai Jawan Govinda Pathak from Jogeshwari, Mumbai, made an entry into the Guinness World Record by forming a human pyramid of 9 tiers 43.79 feet (13.35 m) at the Dahi Handi event held in Thane; the previous record was held by Spain since 1981. A lobby pushed for the possibility of making it an official sport in the same year, while critics said that it should remain just a street celebration.

In 2008 a mandal known as Mazgaon Sarvajanik Ganeshotsav Mandal made the first ever 9-tier human pyramid in India at Vartak Nagar Thane. The Mazgaon area is also known as a Dahi Handi Chi Pandhari as they have maintained and followed all the rituals for a long period of time. Also the Mazgaon Tadwadi Govinda Pathak made the first ever 6-tier, 7-tier and 8- tier pyramids.

== Issues ==
The presence of these mass celebrations and mandals cause traffic congestion and problems like excessive littering. It also causes the issue of sound pollution, with the Supreme Court of India's prescribed guidelines being 55–65 decibels.

Participation carries a high risk of mortality. The number of injuries increased due to higher competition since 2000. A report in 2012 from the Journal of Postgraduate Medicine, concluded that "There is a considerable risk of serious, life-threatening injuries inherent to human pyramid formation and descent in the Dahihandi festival". It recommended safety guidelines like reducing the height of the pot, preventing children from participating and using safety gear.

In 2012, over 225 govindas were injured with one casualty; this was higher than the previous year's 205. The government of Maharashtra banned children below 12 years from participating in 2014. The Bombay High Court later ruled in August that the minimum age should be raised to 18 years and height of the pyramid should be no more than 20 feet due to safety reasons. The Supreme Court of India refused to clarify the Bombay High Court thereby upholding it, but various organizations have re-appealed on different legal grounds. They state that olympic sports are dangerous and cause injuries too, but that is not sufficient grounds to ban Olympic participation. Banning a religious tradition, they state, infringes on the religious rights of a particular community. Several parties have defied the ban.

== Modern developments ==
=== Pro Govinda League ===
The Pro Govinda League (PGL) is a professionalized, competitive version of the traditional Dahi Handi event, a popular cultural celebration in Maharashtra, India, held during Krishna Janmashtami. The PGL features organized teams, formal safety protocols, player auctions and televised matches, aiming to elevate the traditional sport to a professionally structured sporting event. The league was launched by former chief minister Eknath Shinde in 2022, to promote the native sport along the lines of other professional sports. The game’s first season was in 2023.

=== Latest Season ===
The third season, held from 7 to 9 August 2025 at the Dome SVP Stadium in Worli, Mumbai, involved 16 city-based teams competing for a record prize pool of ₹1.5 crore. Season 3 also featured West Indies cricketer Chris Gayle as brand ambassador, aiming to increase international visibility for the event. The league has received coverage in national media and on streaming platforms, with commentators noting it as a significant example of the commercialization and modernization of the Dahi Handi tradition.

=== Key Features of the Pro Govinda League ===
- Professional Structure: The PGL transforms the traditional Dahi Handi into a formalized league with organized teams, formal safety measures, player auctions, and televised matches.
- Team Competition: Teams compete against each other, with matches often involving multiple bouts, each with its own set of rules and scoring.
- Safety Protocols: The league emphasizes safety, with measures like safety nets and mattresses to cushion falls, and age and height restrictions for participants.
- National Recognition: The PGL aims to expand its reach beyond Maharashtra, allowing teams to represent cities from across India, giving the competition a broader national character, according to league organizers.
- Financial Aspects: The PGL has increased its prize pool significantly, with the 2025 season offering a record ₹1.5 crore, with the winning team receiving ₹75 lakh, according to organizers.
- Brand Ambassadors: The league has attracted celebrity endorsements, with Chris Gayle serving as a brand ambassador to enhance international visibility.
- Mumbai Based: The PGL is based in Mumbai, with the 2025 season taking place at the SVP Dome in Worli.
- Cultural Significance: The PGL is seen as a celebration of courage, teamwork, and the cultural heritage of Maharashtra.

== See also ==
- Ganesh Chaturthi
- Holi
- Raksha Bandhan
- Diwali
- Castell
