= Castellers de Sarrià =

The Castellers de Sarrià was a human towers team from Sarrià district in Barcelona that was created in 1998 and made their official debut in 2000. The human towers structures they built were the pillar of 4, the pillar of 5 (only assembled), the 2 by 6, the 3 by 6, the 3 by 6 lifted from below, the 3 by 6 plus pillar, the 4 by 6, the 4 by 6 plus pillar and the 5 by 6.

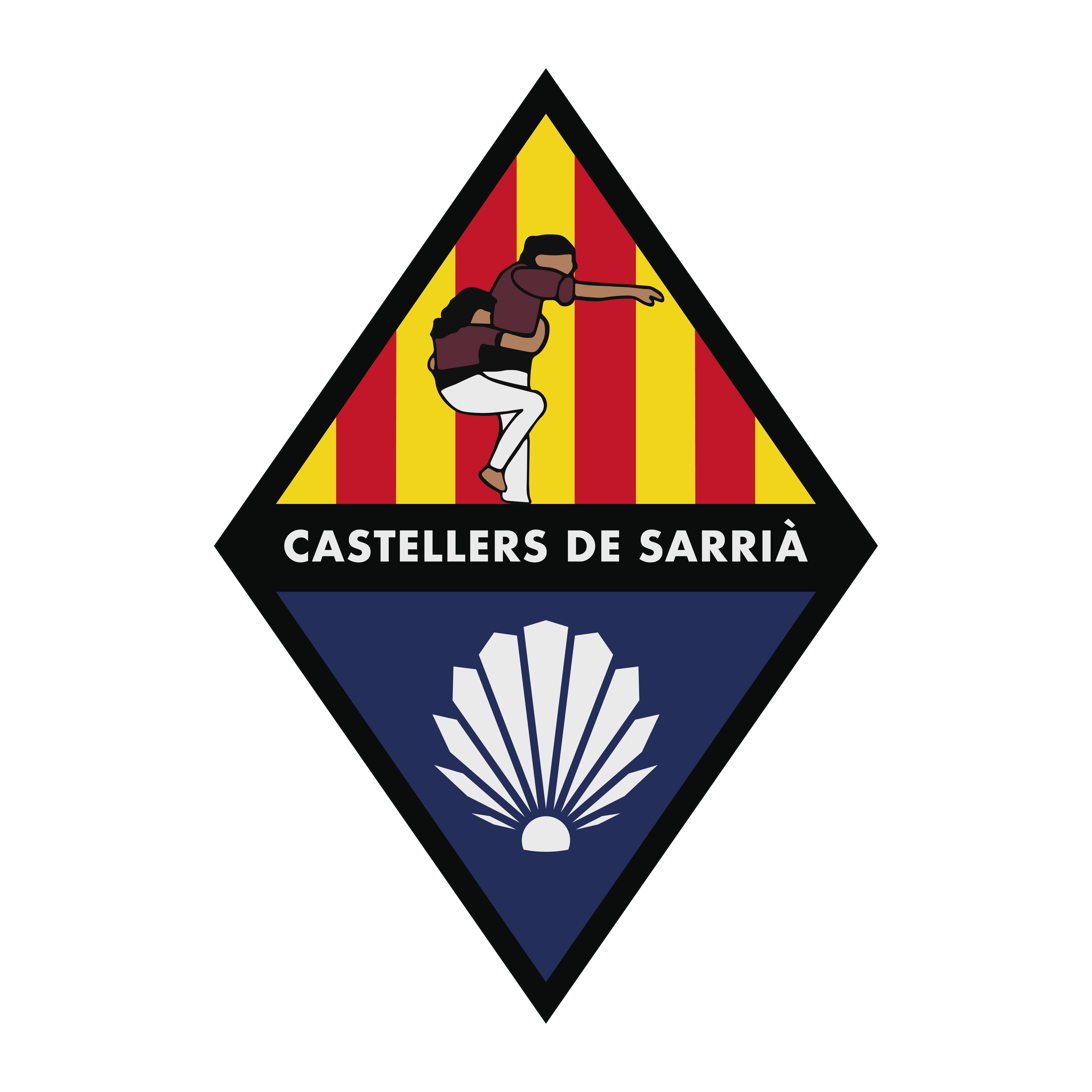
Castellers de Sarrià emblem

== History ==
Starting with the recruitment of local people at a cultural associations exhibition that took place in Sarrià district, training sessions began at the Casal de Sarrià urban garden. More and more people joined, some of whom were already members of other cultural groups like the Gegants de Sarrià, the Diables i Drac de Sarrià, as well as those who came from other districts or even cities. During those initial months the team was helped and advised by members of well experienced human towers teams like the Castellers de Sants and Castellers de la Vila de Gràcia.

On Oct. 12th 1999 the Castellers de Sarrià completed a non-official performance. Its 70 members in still white shirt attire built two pillars of 4 and one 3 by 6 during the human towers show that took place at the district's annual festival in which the Castellers de Barcelona, the Capgrossos de Mataró and the Bordegassos de Vilanova teams performed.

A second non-official performance in still white shirt attire took place on March 19, 2000, beside the Castellers de Barcelona and Castellers del Poble Sec to celebrate the latter's anniversary. The structures that the Castellers de Sarrià built that day were the 4 by 6, the 2 by 5, the 3 by 6 and the usual pillar of 4 at the beginning and end of the show.

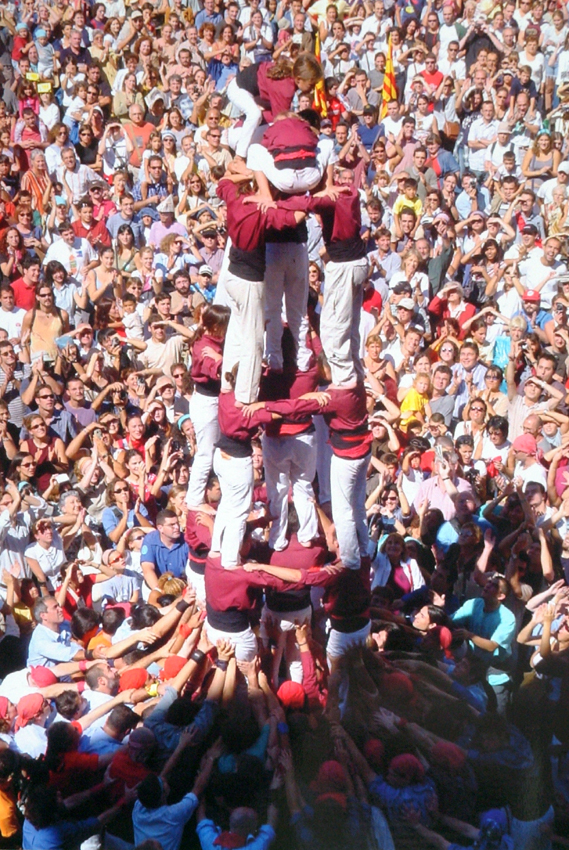
5 by 6 by the Castellers de Sarrià in Sant Jaume square, Barcelona

Finally, on May 28, 2000, at the district's Consell de la Vila square, the Castellers de Sarrià held their official presentation in their official maroon shirts beside guest teams Castellers de Sants, Castellers de la Vila de Gràcia and Nyerros de la Plana. The local team was able to build a 3 by 6 (although it collapsed during the disassembly phase), a 4 by 6 plus pillar, a 4 by 6 and 2 pillars of 4.

In 2002 the Castellers de Sarrià sponsored the Castellers de la Sagrada Família team on the occasion of their official presentation.

The best human towers structures ever built by the Castellers de Sarrià before its breakup in 2005 were the pillar of 5 (only assembled) and the 2 by 6.

Some years later, at the end of 2011, a group of local people thought of creating a new human towers team in Sarrià-Sant Gervasi districts who, after reaching an agreement with the former Castellers de Sarrià representatives, were going to use the same shirt colour and the same emblem and would become Barcelona's seventh human towers team. However this attempt didn't succeed and the new team never performed.

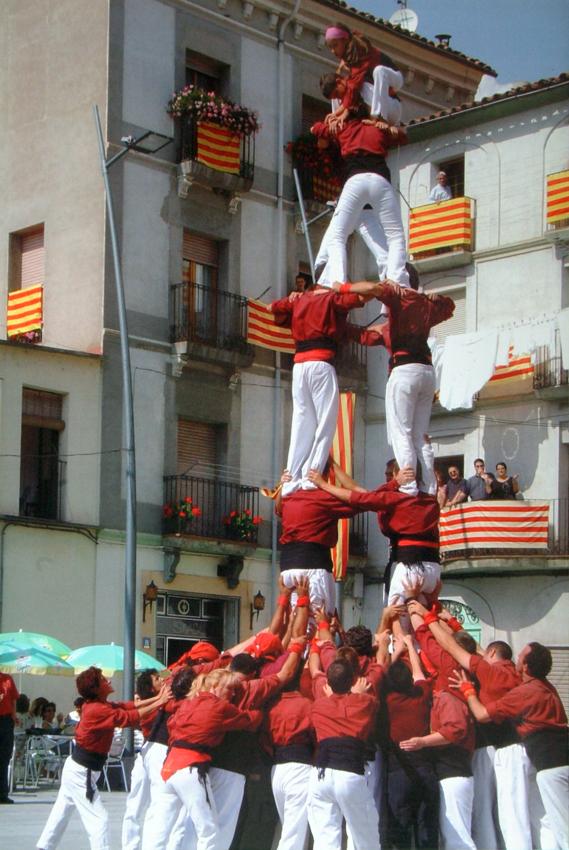
4 by 6 by the Castellers de Sarrià

In October 2016, the team was refunded and in May 2017 it is elected to be a team in formation by the CCCC (Coordinadora de Colles Castelleres de Catalunya). In the Festa Major de Sarrià (October 8, 2017) they was presented to their neighbours making a pillar of 4, 2 trials of a 3 by 6, a 3 by 6 and ending with a pillar of 4 at the balcony.

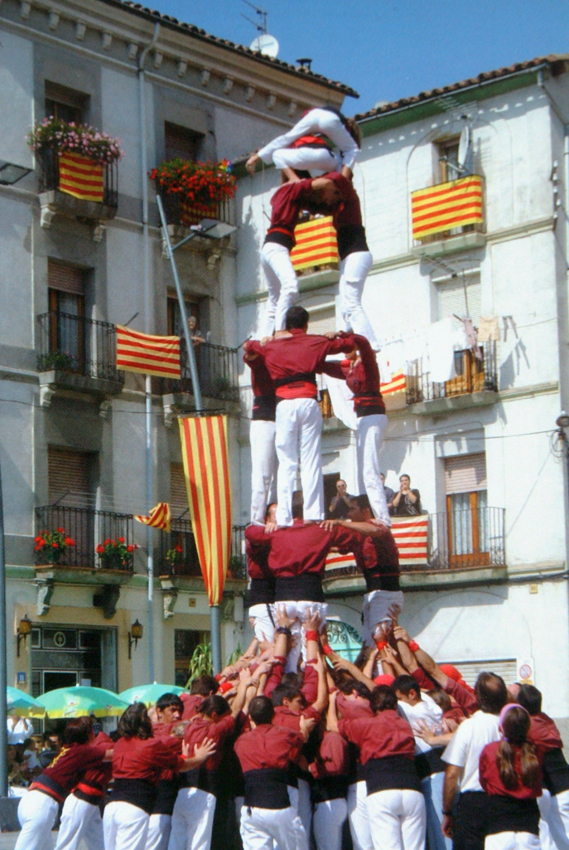
3 by 6 by the Castellers de Sarrià

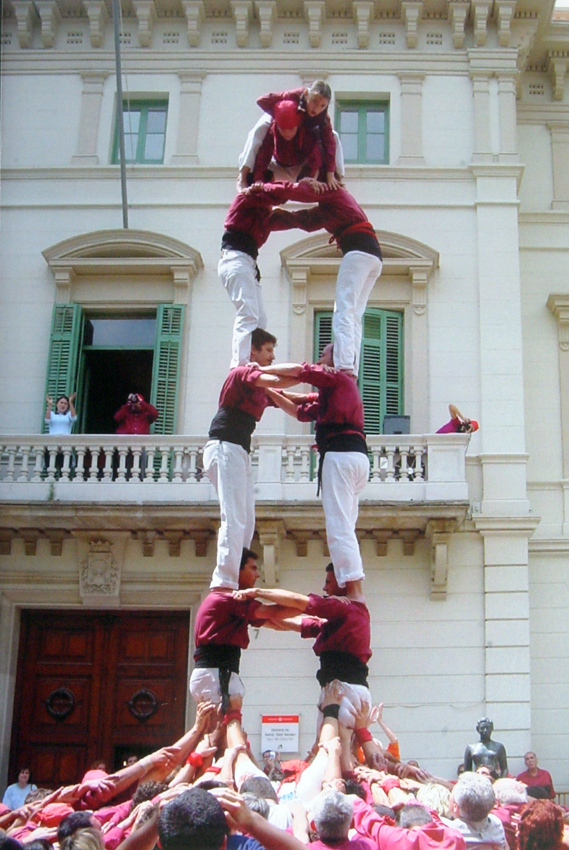
2 by 6 by the Castellers de Sarrià in Consell de la Vila square, Barcelona

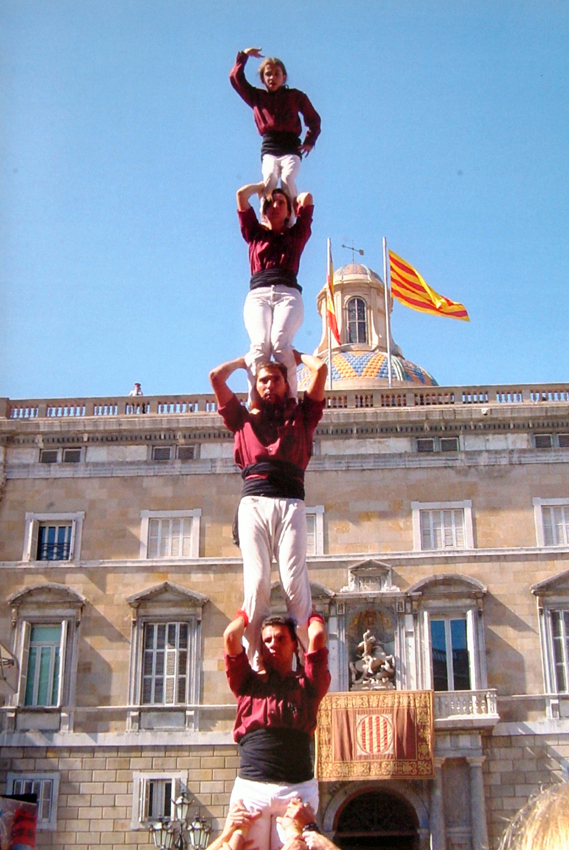
Pillar of 5 by the Castellers de Sarrià in Sant Jaume square, Barcelona
