= Josep Sala Mañé =

Spanish casteller (1938–2020)

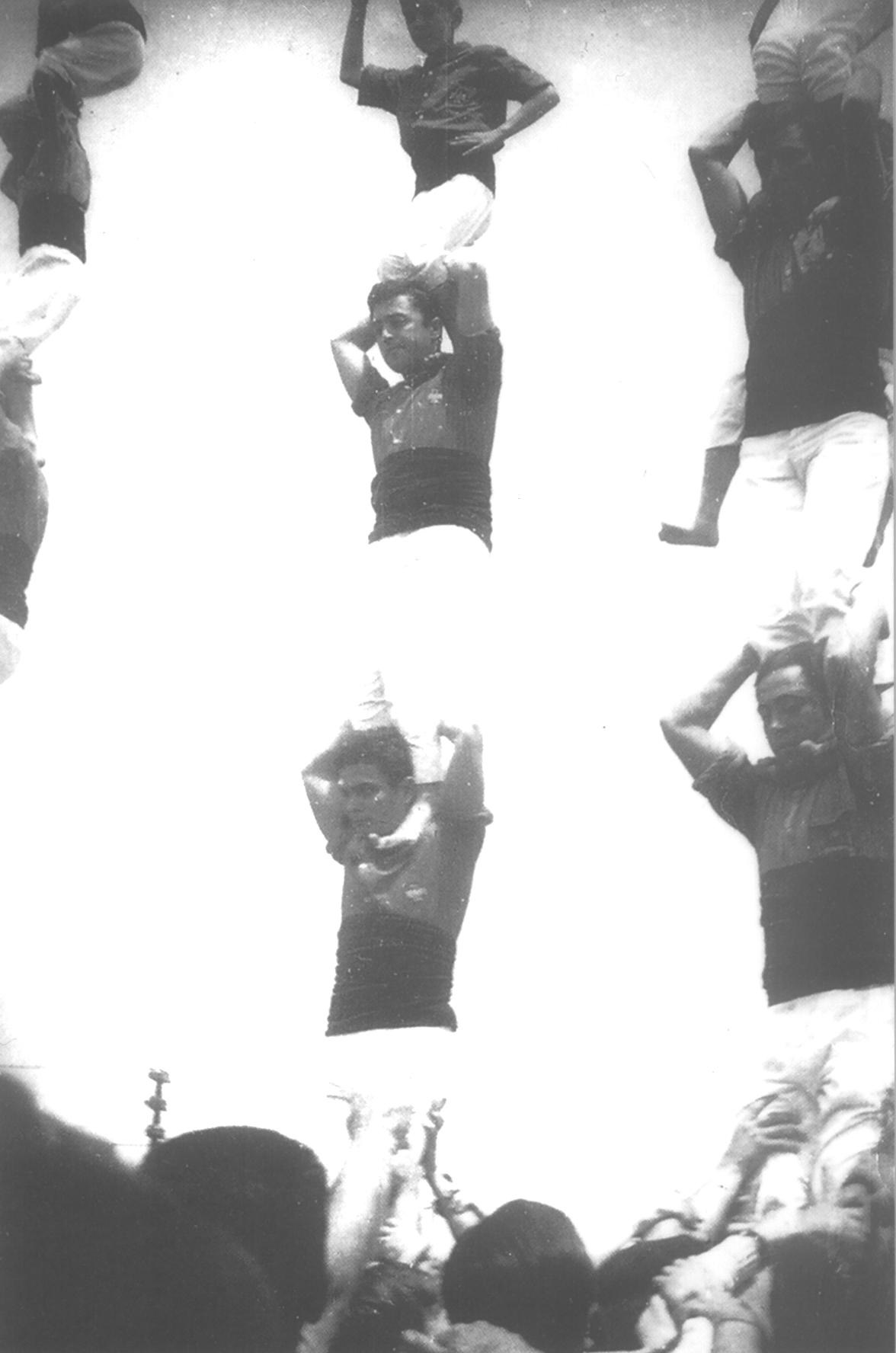
Sala (the first one below the middle pillar) in the first colla actuation in 1969

Josep Sala i Mañé (1938 – 20 April 2020) was a Spanish Catalan casteller.

He was born in Vilafranca del Penedès, Spain, in 1938. In his youth, he was member of the Castellers de Vilafranca until his family moved to Barcelona in the 50s. In 1958, alongside the Duch family and Pere Català i Roca he founded the colla (team) of Castellers de Ballets de Cataluña, but this group dissolved in 1963. Six years later, Sala founded the Castellers de Barcelona, the fourth oldest, and was its head between 1969 and 1976.

He died on 20 April 2020 in his hometown, at the age of 82, after suffering from COVID-19 during COVID-19 pandemic in Spain.
