= Cursa de la Mercè =

Footrace in Barcelona

Cursa de la Mercè (Mercè Race) is a public athletic race with free registration that is held annually in the streets of Barcelona since 1979. It is organized by the City Council of Barcelona.

The race is held on the morning of Sunday of the second half of September, forming part of the La Mercè festival. Its current route runs through the most central streets of Barcelona, with exit and arrival to Avenida de Maria Cristina, between the Plaza España and the Montjuïc mountain. During its history, it has had many variations of distance, between 8 and 11 kilometers. The athletes who have won most times are Joan Viudez, on four occasions, and Núria Pastor Amorós, on seven occasions.
