= Castellers de Berga =

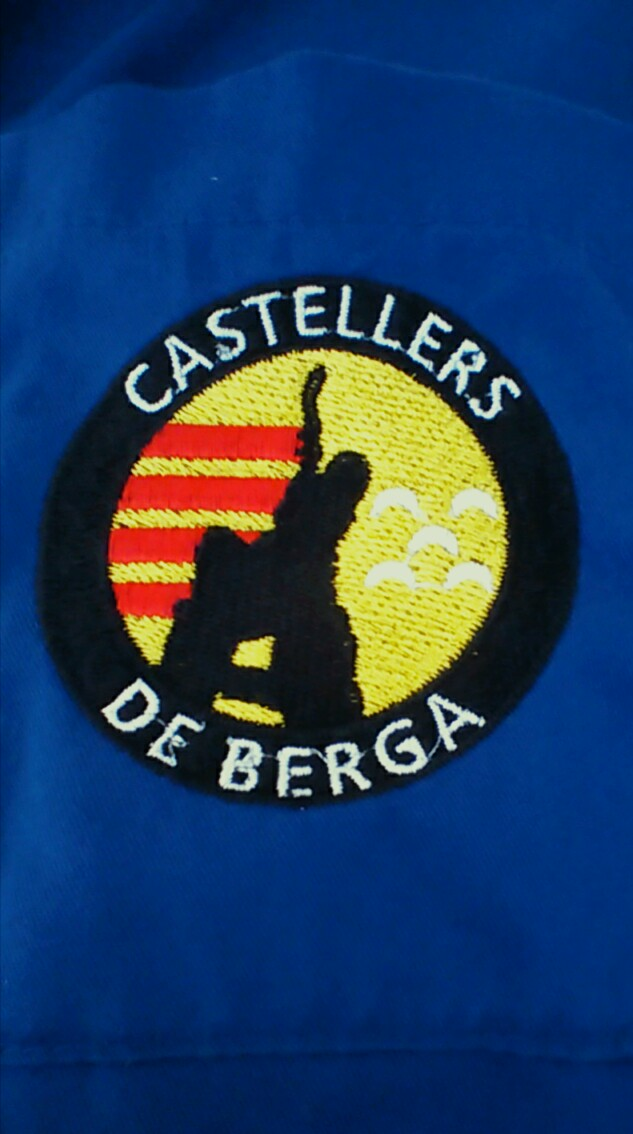
Detail of the Castellers de Berga shirt and symbol

The Castellers de Berga (Catalan pronunciation: [kəstəˈʎez ðə ˈβeɾɣə]) are a colla castellera, or human tower team, based in Berga with members from throughout El Berguedà and beyond. They were founded in 2012. Their shirt is navy blue. To date, the Castellers de Berga have achieved high-range seven-level constructions and on October 1, 2016, they achieved their first eight-level castell.

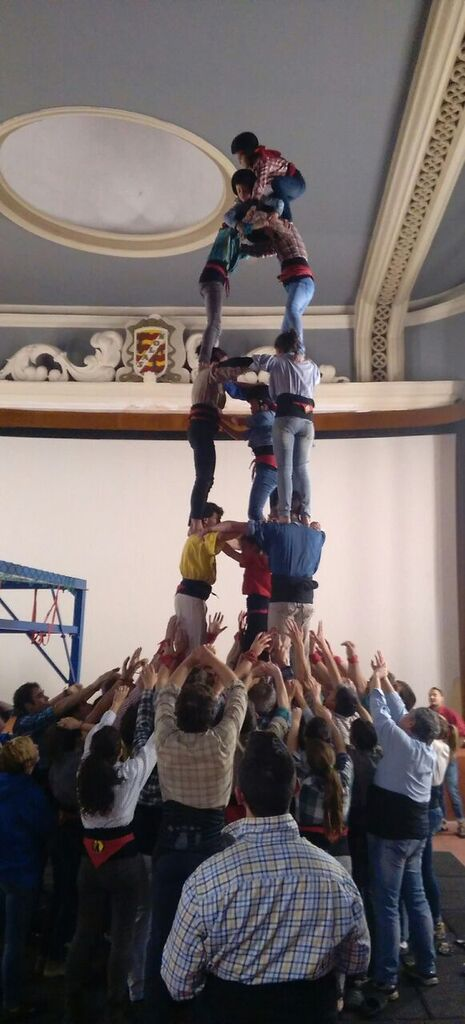
The Castellers de Berga practicing at their headquarters, the Cinema Catalunya

== History ==
Although El Berguedà is not a region where castells are traditionally built, in 2011 a group of people from Berga (many of whom had experience participating in university teams) decided to create a new colla based in the town. Their first performance was on May 1, 2012, and their so-called "baptism"—their first official performance with colored shirts—was on July 7 of the same year. After building only six-level constructions their first year, the colla moved on to seven-level castells in 2013. In 2016, they began to practice eight-level castells.

In 2015, the colla appeared extensively in the news documentary program Welt Spiegel on German public television. The program associated the tradition of castells with the Catalan independence movement.

The Castellers de Berga have been based in a series of different buildings, including a school and a garage in Berga and a theatre in Cal Rosal, a former industrial colony a few miles south of Berga. However, in 2015 they moved to the Cinema Catalunya, a historic movie theatre on the main street in Berga's old town.

In 2016, the Castellers de Berga achieved their first eight-level castell at the bi-annual castell competition in Tarragona, where they were the newest colla to participate.

== Calendar ==
The Colla organizes a series of castell performances, or diades, in Berga each year. Their principal performance is the Diada dels Quatre Fuets, held in Berga's main square (the Plaça Sant Pere) the weekend before the Patum festival. They also build castells on May 1 for the May Day fair held every year in Berga, and they organize a diada in the beginning of July to mark the anniversary of the colla's baptism. Finally, in October they perform in Berga as part of the town's annual Festa del Bolet, or mushroom festival.

In order to raise money for their activities and to encourage group cohesion, the Castellers de Berga also organize a series of cultural activities each year, including a craft fair, an urban obstacle course or concerts.
