= Castellers de la Vila de Gràcia =

Coordinates: 41°24′14.86″N 2°9′11.06″E

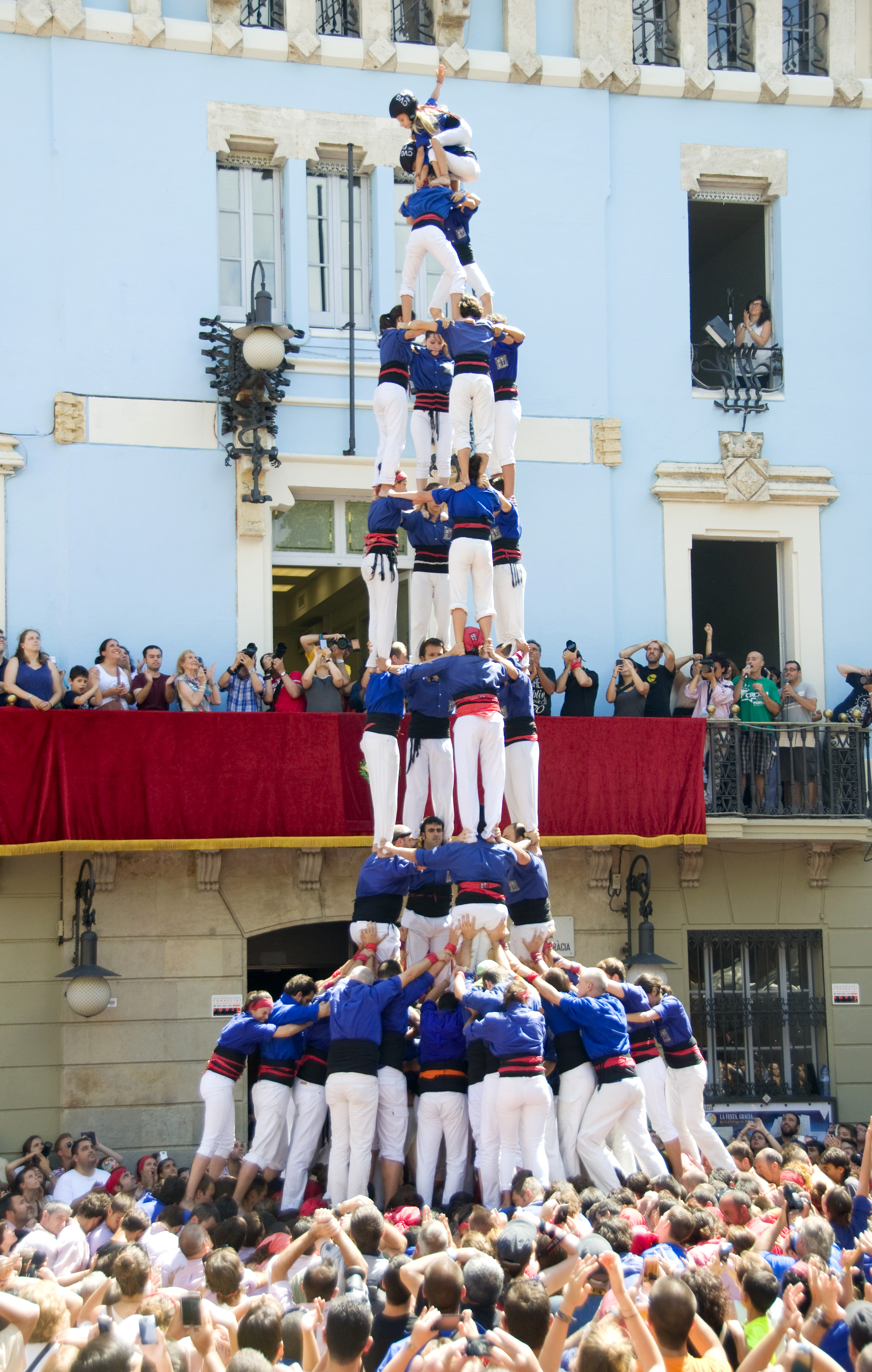
First 4d9f from Castellers de la Vila de Gràcia presented during the Fiesta Mayor de Gràcia festivities in 2014.

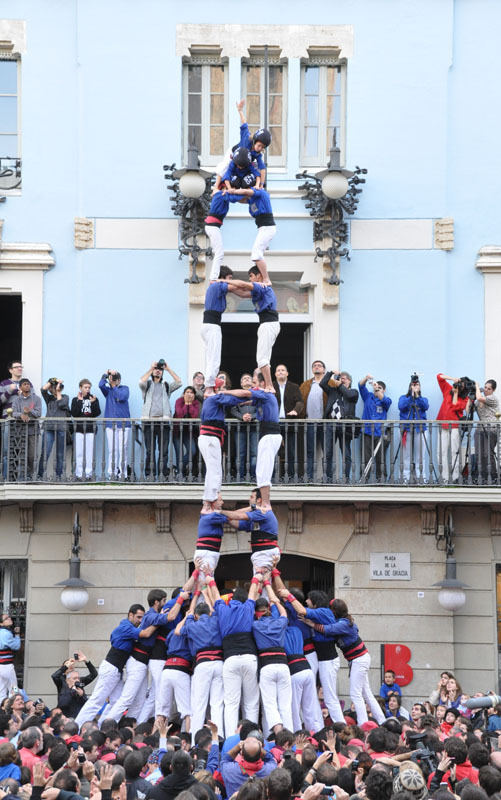
2 de 8 with folre from Castellers de la Vila de Gràcia on November 20, 2011, in Plaza de la Vila de Gràcia square.

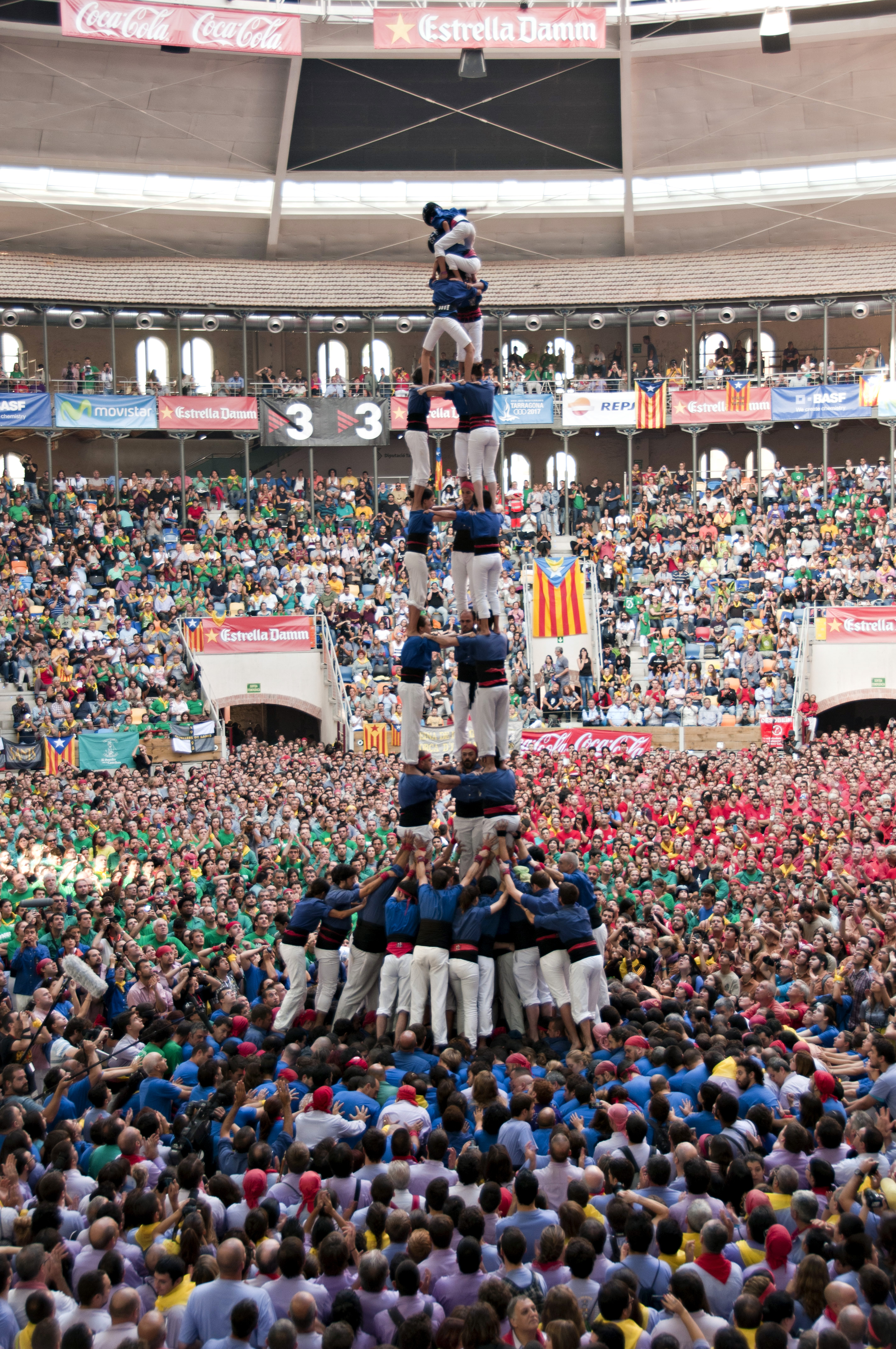
3 de 9 with folre done in the XXV Concurs de Castells competition, in Tarragona (2014)

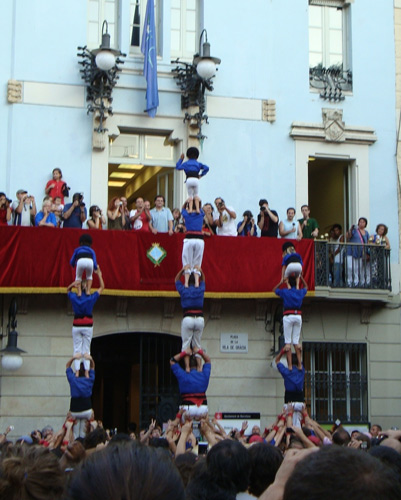
Vano de cinc of Castellers de la Vila de Gràcia at Plaça de la Vila de Gràcia in the Festa Major de Gràcia (22/08/2009)

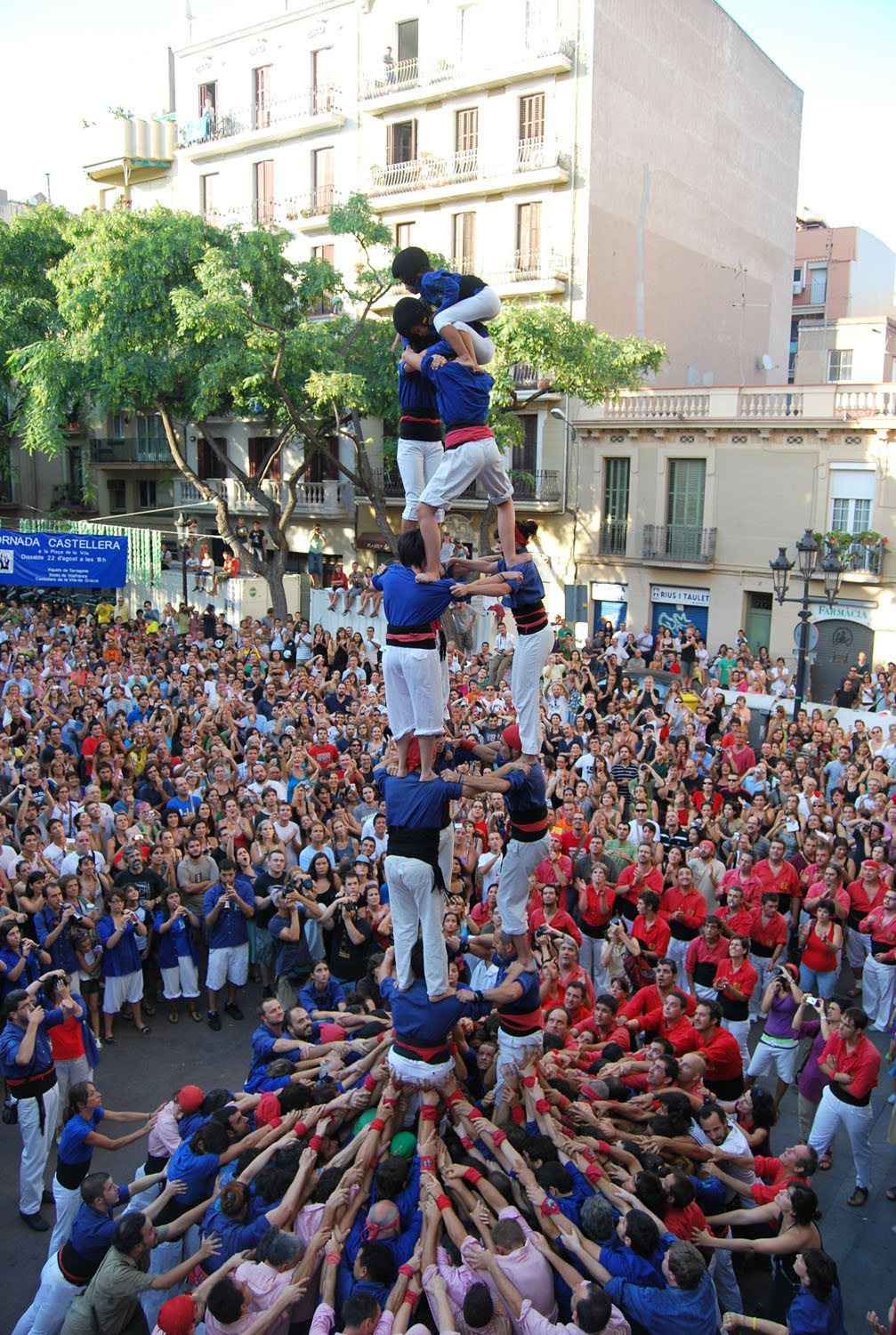
3 de 7 aixecat per sota about to be loaded. Festa Major de Gràcia (22/08/2009)

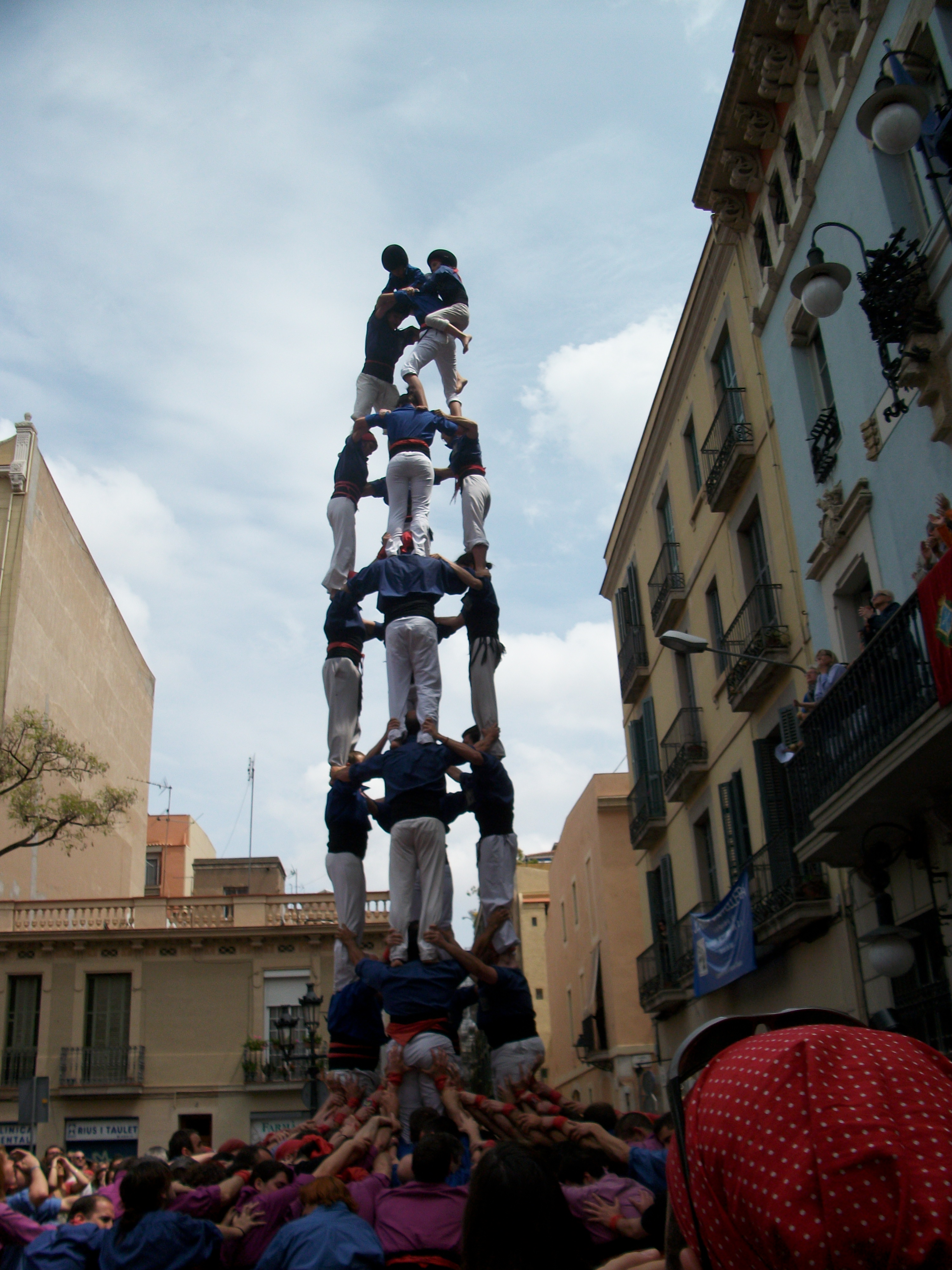
4 de 8 in Gràcia (9/5/2010)

The Castellers de la Vila de Gràcia (Catalan pronunciation: [kəstəˈʎez ðə lə ˈβilə ðə ˈɣɾasiə]), created in 1996, are a colla castellera, based in Vila de Gràcia that makes human castles. They made their first public presentation in 1997 supported by the groups Castellers de Terrassa, the Castellers de Sants and the Castellers de Sant Andreu de la Barca. The colour of their shirts is navy blue.

The first 4 de 8 ( a human castle 8 stories high with 4 people in each level) unloaded by the Castellers de Gràcia (to unload a castle means to start and finish the castle without falling ) was achieved on August 17, 2003, in the Plaça de la Vila de Gracia.

Their best performance, done on October 24, 2014, in Barcelona is 3 de 9 amb folre, 4 de 9 amb folre, 3 de 8 amb agulla and Pilar de 7 amb folre.

Up to the year 2015, the Castellers de la Vila de Gràcia participated seven times in the Castle-making contest, which is celebrated every two years in Tarragona: in 2002, 2004, 2006, 2008, 2010, 2012 and 2014. Their best performance was in 2014, when they finished 5th over 41 participants.

They are commonly known as "The Blue Gang", because of the colour of their shirts or "The Student Gang" because of the young age of most of their members.

Castellers de la Vila de Gràcia appear briefly in the movie L'auberge espagnole by Cédric Klapisch.

== History ==
Castle making is nothing new in Gràcia, and there are historical references which date this tradition back to the last quarter of the 19th century until the first thirty years of the 20th century. Around 1890, a "colla" was created by immigrant peasants who had left Tarragona because of the phylloxera, and was called Xiquets de Gràcia. Possibly, these new Gracia neighbours found in the Vila de Gràcia, which by then was still a small town, the ideal atmosphere to make human castles and become a local "colla". It is known and documented that this "colla" began its activities at least since the 1880s until the year 1900, 1910 and in the second decade of the 20th century. Most performances were executed during the Festa Major de Gràcia.

== The beginnings ==
The story of the Castellers de la Vila de Gràcia begins in the early 1990s, when a group of youngsters related to the network of neighbourhood associations in Gràcia began to talk about the possibility of founding a Castle making colla in the neighbourhood. This idea began to take shape when they decided to celebrate their first meeting in October 1996, and news began to spread that there was a "colla castellera" in the making. The first rehearsal was on November 23 of that same year at the Plaça del Sol, and it gathered around thirty people.

The first public performance of the new colla was in February 1997, on occasion of the Diada Castellera de Santa Eulàlia on Placa de Sant Jaume de Barcelona, where they constructed two pillars of 4 ( One person per story, 4 stories; this is considered as the most simple construction of the whole repertoire) The first performance in Plaça de la Vila de Gràcia, which is considered as the colla's square, was delivered on March 4, 1997. This actuation gathered around sixty castellers, who unloaded several basic constructions.

== The first castles ==
The official introduction of the new colla into the casteller world was on May 4, 1997, sponsored by the Castellers de Terrasa, the Castellers de Sants and the Castellers de Sant Andreu de la Barca, the Catellers de la Vila de Gràcia unloaded their first six story high castles. This first season had its ups and downs, although the efforts made throughout the year finally bore fruit with the achievement of a seven stories high castle, the 4 de 7, unloaded in order to celebrate their anniversary on November 23.

== The transition from castles of 7 to castles of 8 ==
Throughout the following years, the Colla de Gràcia evolved and became a colla de 7 until October 6, 2002, when during the XIX Tarragona castle making contest, they achieved their first 4 de 8 after unloading their first 2 de 7 on the previous round. Ever since that year, the Castellers de la Vila de Gràcia have unloaded a 4 de 8 every year, and have started to gain their place as a colla de 8 and as one of the best 15-20 "colles" of the current casteller world.

Since their first months of existence, the Colla of Gràcia has had its own team of grallers, which has evolved into a learning center for all of those interested in learning how to play the gralla (a traditional Catalan oboe) in the different activities held by the castellers.

In 1999, the Castellers de la Vida de Gràcia received the Barcelona's Honour Medal, and they are also members of the Colles de Cultura Popular de Gràcia.

== Rehearsals ==
The Castellers de la Vila de Gràcia have rehearsed in different spots in the neighbourhood, among which we can mention l´Escola Josep Maria Jujol, L´Artesá de Gràcia and the Antiga Escola OSI and in the Escola Reina Escola Reina Violeat School, were they rehearsed for 10 years (from 2002 to 2012). Since 2012 they have their own training place, Espai Cultural Albert Musons.

== Other activities ==
Since the year 1998, the Castellers de la Vila de Gràcia broadcast the casteller radio program "Tercos amunt!" on Ràdio Gràcia. This radio program is still being broadcast currently. In 2010 "Tercos amunt!" received the Premi Vila de Gràcia to the best communication initiative.

Until the year 2004, they published a magazine called "L´espadat" which came out every three months.

But the most important extracurricular activity taken on by the castellers de la Vila de Gràcia, is the ornamentation of the Plaça de la Vila for the festivities of la Festa Major de Gràcia since the year 2001.

== Participation in the tarragona casteller contest ==
The Castellers de la Vila de Gràcia have participated on seven occasions in the Tarragona Casteller Contest. Below are all the contests where the Colla has participated, the castles unloaded and, between parenthesis and in bold lettering, the final position on the ranking.

- XIX Tarragona castell contest (2002): 2 de 7, 4 de 8c, 5 de 7 (13)
- XX Tarragona castell contest (2004): 4 de 8i, 4 d 8c, 5 de 7, 4 de 7a (14)
- XXI Tarragona castell contest (2006): 2 de 7c, 4 de 8c (16)
- XXII Tarragona castell contest (2008): 5 de 7, 4 de 8c, 4 de 7a (15)
- XXIII Tarragona castell contest (2010): 4 de 8, 2 de 7, 5 de 7 (11)
- XXIV Tarragona castell contest (2012): 4de8, 3de9f (id), 3de9f (id),3de8, 2de7 (15)
- XXV Tarragona castell contest (2014): 4de9f, 3de9f, 4d8a (5)

== The Castellers de la Vila de Gràcia in the world ==
Performances held outside the Països Catalans

- Marseille (2001)
- Carcassonne (2002)
- Sevilla (2005)
- Montreal (2015)

Performances held within the Països Catalans (outside Catalonia)

- País Valencià
  - Algemesí (2003)
  - La Xara (Dénia) (2007)
  - L'Alcúdia (2009)
- Northern Catalonia
  - Baó (1998) (1999)
  - Perpinyà (2005)
- Balearic Islands
  - Sant Francesc de Formentera, Formentera (2010)
  - Eivissa, Eivissa (2010)

== The cap de colla ==
The Cap de Colla is the highest technical responsible of the colles castelleres.

Name:	Period:
Joaquim Besaran i Alberich	November 1996-June 1997
Guillem Ortega i Tous	1997 (starting on June)
Jordi Ràfols i Brasó	1998-2000-2001
Carles Capellades i Sesé	1999-2004-2005
Joan Font i Basté	2002–2003
Oriol Constantí i González	2006–2007
Carles Gallardo i Prades	2008–2009
Aleix Vila i Fuertes	2010

== Presidents ==
Name	Period
Ramon Josep Serra i Ruiz "R.J."	November 1996-June 1997
David Palau i Garcia	1997 (from June on...)
Josep Maria Porta i Palau	1998
Roger Gispert i Masó	1999-2000-2001-2004-2005
Miquel Moret i Parera	2002–2003
Martí Urgell i Vidal	2006–2007
Miquel Sendra i Pons	2008–2009
Arnau Dòria i Cerezo	2010

== First castles unloaded ==
Castle	Date	Occasion
4 de 6	May 4, 1997	Official presentation.
3 de 6	May 4, 1997	Official presentation.
4 de 6 amb agulla	May 4, 1997	Official presentation.
5 de 6	September 21, 1997	La Mercè
3 de 6 per sota	August 16, 1998	Festa Major de Gràcia
Pilar de 5 car.	August 16, 1998	Festa Major de Gràcia
Pilar de 5	October 18, 1998	Diada de les colles del 97
Pilar de 5 per sota	November 24, 2002	Diada dels Castellers de Badalona
2 de 6 car.	November 9, 1997	Diada dels Castellers de Sant Andreu de la Barca
2 de 6	March 29, 1998	Solidaritat Nens del Brasil
6 de 6	August 19, 2000	Vigílies de Festa Major de Gràcia
4 de 7	November 23, 1997	I Diada de la Colla
3 de 7 car.	November 29, 1998	Diada dels Castellers de Badalona
3 de 7	September 26, 1999	La Mercè
3 de 7 amb agulla	April 25, 1998	Diada de Sant Jordi (Sitges)
4 de 7 amb agulla car.	November 22, 1998	II Diada de la Colla
4 de 7 amb agulla car.	November 22, 1998	II Diada de la Colla
4 de 7 amb l'agulla	May 16, 1999	II Aniversari de la Colla
5 de 7	September 25, 2000	La Mercè
3 de 7 aixecat per sota	August 19, 2001	Festa Major de Gràcia
2 de 7 car.	September 24, 2002	La Mercè
2 de 7	October 6, 2002	XIX Tarragona Casteller Contest
4 de 8 car.	October 6, 2002	XIX Tarragona Casteller Contest.
4 de 8	August 17, 2003	Festa Major de Gràcia
3 de 8 car.	September 24, 2010	La Mercè

== Specified bibliography ==
- Albert Musons, Quim Perelló, Jordi Ràfols i Miquel Sendra: Xiquets ahir, castellers per sempre: Vila de Gràcia (1876–2002), Col·lecció "La Font de l'atzavara" del Taller d'Història de Gràcia, 111 pages., Barcelona.
- Carles Gallardo: Blau, fraternitat i castells: Castellers de la Vila de Gràcia (1997–2001), 126 pages, Published by the Castellers de la Vila de Gràcia.
