= Castellers de Sydney =

Australian casteller group

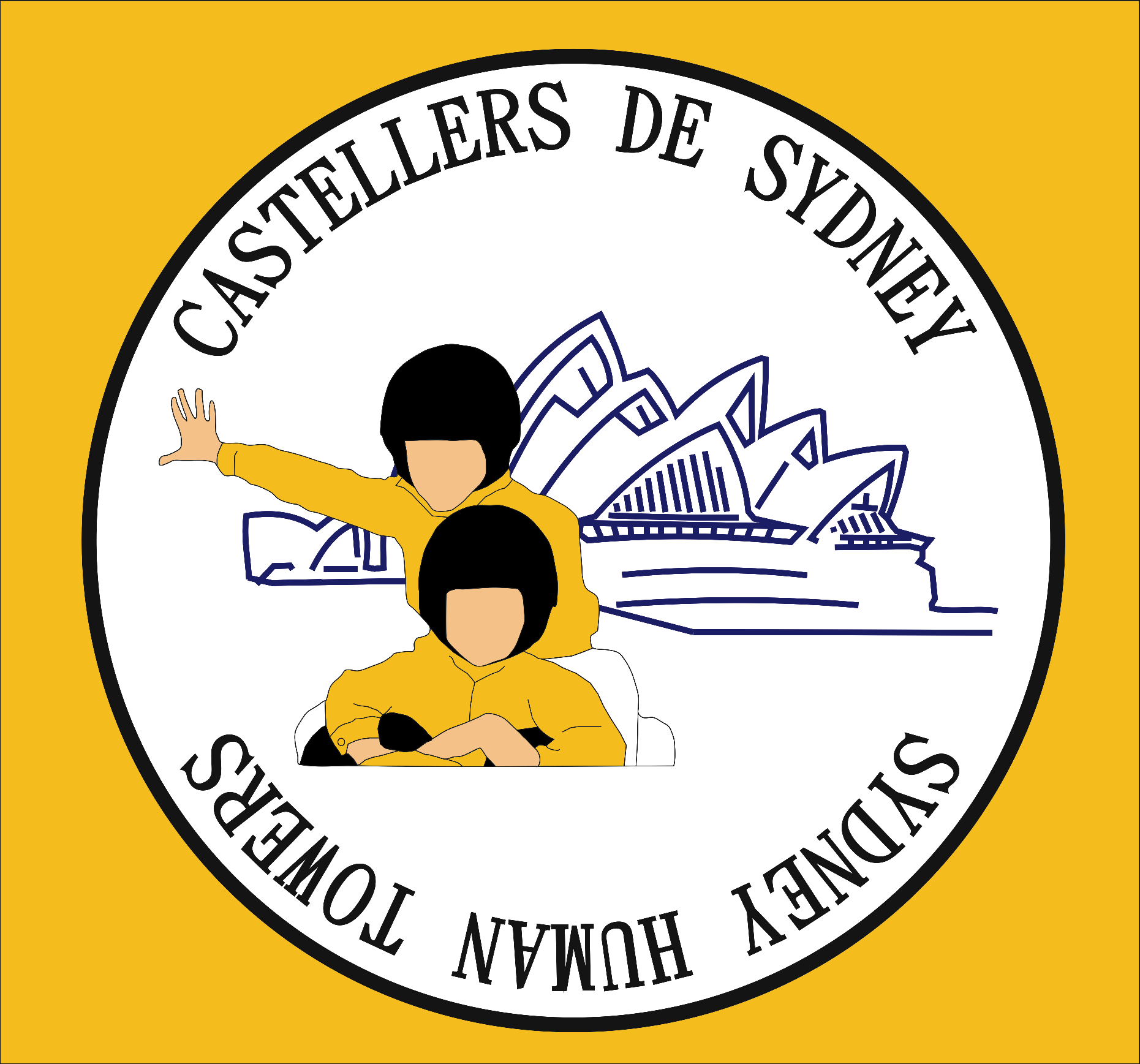
- Alias: Kangaroos
- Foundation: 2016
- Shirt color: Yellow (Gold)
- Location: Sydney, Australia
- Best towers: 4of6, 4of6 with a pillar, 3of6, pillar of 4
- Best performance: 4of6, 4of6 with a pillar, 3of6, pillar of 4
- Official website: https://sydneyhumantowers.com

Castellers de Sydney is a casteller organisation based on Sydney, Australia. As castells are a tradition originating from Catalonia, most of their members are of Catalan origin. However, other nationalities, including American, French, German, Australian, are also members.

== History ==
The Castellers de Sydney commenced operations on June 24, 2016, with the construction of a three-level pillar in Sydney, with one person standing atop another, which served as their first public performance. This date is now commemorated as their anniversary.

Subsequently, the team initiated regular practice sessions every Thursday at 6pm in Hyde Park. These rehearsals drew interest from the Australian public, introducing them to the tradition and offering opportunities to participate in building the casteller.

Over time, the team's expertise advanced, leading to the successful completion of structures such as the 3of5, 4of5, pillar of 4, 4of5 with a needle (a pillar integrated within the 4-level structure), and 2of5. These accomplishments indicated both an increase in membership and the team's technical progression, as they constructed increasingly intricate towers.

During their first anniversary, the team attempted a 4of6 tower for the first time, but it was dismantled before the enxaneta, or the child at the top, could reach the summit.

On September 10, in celebration with the National Day of Catalonia and an event organised by the Casal Català de NSW (Catalan Association of New South Wales), the Castellers de Sydney built the first-ever six-level towers in Oceania. This accomplishment established a record for the most remote tower in the history of castellers.

In a subsequent performance on February 17, organised by the Catalan Association of New South Wales and in collaboration with the Melbourne team, Koalas of Melbourne, the Castellers de Sydney accomplished their first complete performance in Oceania. This performance required the construction of at least three towers of six or more levels and a pillar of four levels. The team achieved this by building a 3of6, 4of6, and 4of6 with the pillar, marking the best performance to date in the region.
