= Xiquets de Hangzhou =

- Foundation: 2010
- Shirt color: Red/pink
- Location: Hangzhou, China
- Best towers: 3d9f, 2d8f, 3d8
- Best performance: Concurs de Castells de Tarragona 2016

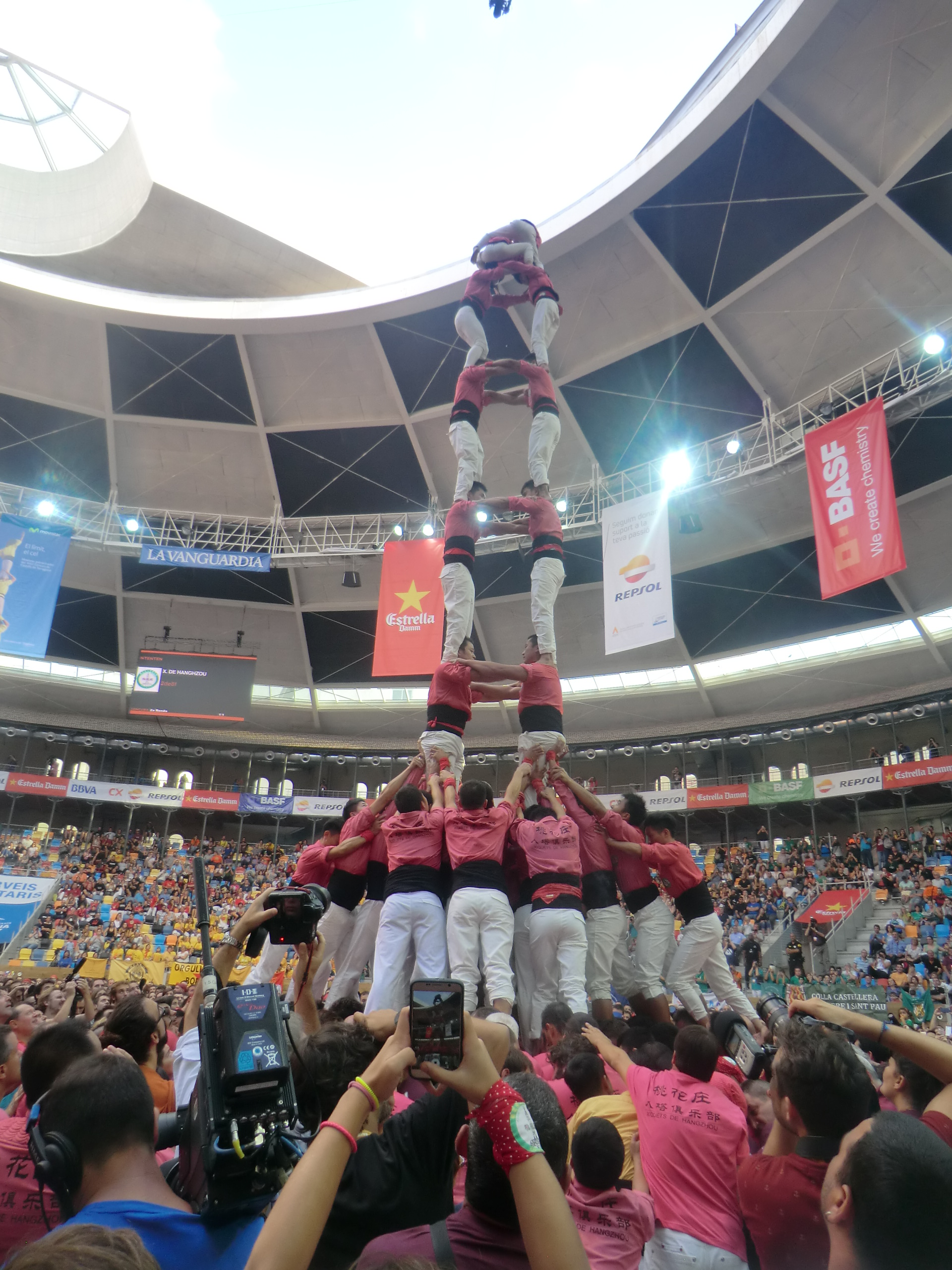
Xiquets de Hangzhou in 2016

Xiquets de Hangzhou (Chinese: 桃花庄 - 人塔俱乐部; pinyin: Táohuāzhuāng - Réntǎ Jùlèbù; lit. 'Club of human towers of the peach flower village') is a Chinese castellers group in Deqing, about 40 km to the northwest of Hangzhou in East China.

The group was created on the initiative of Qian Anhua, who discovered the Catalan tradition of castellers on a trip to Catalonia in 2009. Anhua, president of the Chinese textile company Antex (De Qing) Fashion Clothes Co. Ltd, decided to import castellers to his textile colony as a social activity for the employees. The group initiated their activity in May 2010, as a result of a visit from Colla Vella dels Xiquets de Valls to Shanghai for the International Exhibition. Xiquets de Hangzhou is the most successful colla exterior (castells team outside the Catalan-speaking region). Their best castells are the 3 de 9 amb folre, the 2 de 8 amb folre, the 3 de 8, the 5 de 7, and the 3 de 7 amb l'agulla.

The relationship between Xiquets de Hangzhou and Colla Vella is very close, with Colla Vella traveling to Deqing in 2010 and 2015 and Xiquets de Hangzhou traveling to Catalonia in 2012 (to help Colla Vella in the contest of castells of Tarragona) and 2015.

On October 1, 2016, the group became the first-ever colla exterior to participate in the Concurs de Castells de Tarragona, the casteller world's largest gathering. They amazed spectators by completing a challenging 3 de 9 amb folre, a 2 de 8 amb folre, and a 4 de 8.

== Characteristics ==
Xiquets de Hangzhou premises, prefecture-level city Huzhou (red), Zhejiang province (orange), China (yellow).

Xiquets de Hangzhou is the first and only group of castellers from Asia, and the organisation is quite different from other colles. All members are workers of Antex (De Qing) Fashion Clothes Co. Ltd, manufacturer and supplier of swimsuits and underwear for Western brands. Building towers is one of the many activities that the company offers after work, including dance, music, gymnastics, and tai chi. Antex is a textile colony, with 28.000 m^{2} of work space and about 1,500 workers that live and work on site. More than 200 of the employees are members of Xiquets de Hangzhou.

Qian Anhua found in castles a philosophy and values that he wanted to bring to his factory, and started Xiquets de Hangzhou as a social activity to make his workers happier. The factory has a rehearsal venue to rehearse castells, where there is a security network used for specific constructions. The venue has several decorations and sculptures dedicated to the castellers. All equipment and group activity is sponsored by Anhua, and performances are paid for if completed during working hours. The group shirt is red/pink, like the shirt of Colla Vella dels Xiquets de Valls, with the company name Antex embroidered. David Yuan serves as Antex representative to the Spanish State and permanent link between Xiquets de Hangzhou and Colla Vella, which acts as their godfathers.

== Towers ==
The following table shows the date, the performance, and the town in which every structure has been completed (or only crowned) for the first time, sorted by chronological order.

Tower	Date	Performance	Town
3 de 9 amb folre, 2 de 8 amb folre, 4 de 8	October 1, 2016	Concurs de Castells de Tarragona	Tarragona
3 in 8	May 21, 2016		Wukang
2 in 7	May 5, 2016	International day of the Red Cross	Deqing
2 in 7 (crowned)	October 26, 2014		Shanghai
3 in 7 with the pillar	July 12, 2014	10th Anniversary of the textile colony Antex	Deqing

== Documentary film ==
On 31 May 2016 the documentary film The Peach Blossom Garden. Xiquets of Hangzhou was premiered in the Sense ficció TV3, prime time documentary program, which explains the history of this group of human tower. The film is directed by Enric Ribes and Oriol Martinez and is a coproduction of Televisió de Catalunya, La Lupa Productions and LIC China, with the support of Creative Europe Media and ICEC.

== Recognitions ==
On 8 June 2013, the group received the Castells Prize for the best social initiative "for being able to export the values and the culture of castells to his own land". The prize, given to the seventh Nit de Castells, organised by Castells magazine, was collected by the president of the company, Qian Anhua.
