= Castellers de Barcelona =

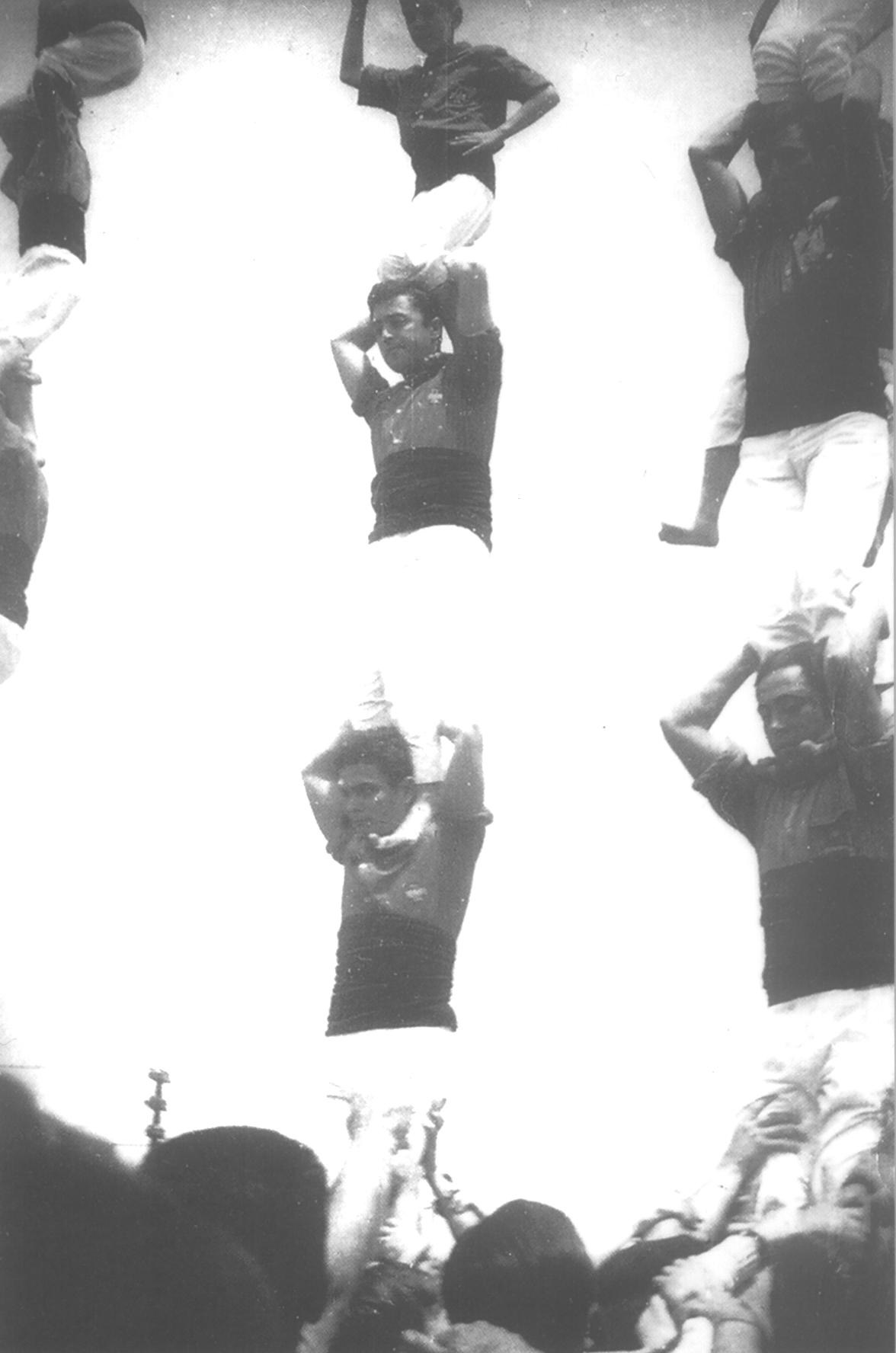
First public display (8 June 1969)

Castellers de Barcelona (Catalan pronunciation: [kəstəˈʎez ðə βəɾsəˈlonə]) is a team of castellers from Barcelona founded in 1969.

It is the first team to be founded outside the traditional area of human towers and the 5th team ever founded. Their first public display was 8 June 1969 in Vendrell. Their shirt is red, and their most important appointment is the closest Sunday to Dia de la Mercè (24 September), in Plaça Sant Jaume. In 2000, the group received the Medal of Honor of Barcelona and two years later (December 3, 2002), for its castellera and civic trajectory, the Castellers of Barcelona were distinguished with the Cross of St. George Award by the Generalitat of Catalonia.

They have crowned almost all the human towers on the range of eight stories and the basic ones of nine. The best human towers crowned by the team are: 5 of 8, 4 of 8 with the needle, 3 of 9 with extra base, 4 of 9 with extra base, 7 of 8 and the pillar of 7 with extra base.

They have received the following awards: the Creu de Sant Jordi of Generalitat de Catalunya, the Medal of Honor of Barcelona and the Sant Martí award from the Sant Martí (district) of Barcelona.

Founder Josep Sala Mañé died in April 2020 from coronavirus.
