= Cal Rosal =

- Singular population entity
- Location within Spain Location within Catalonia Location within Province of Barcelona
- Coordinates: 42°04′23.0″N 1°52′02.3″E
- Country: Spain
- A. community: Catalunya
- Province: Barcelona
- Municipality: Avià; Berga; Olvan

Population (January 1, 2025)
  - Total: 1,115
- Time zone: UTC+01:00
- Postal code: 08611
- MCN: 08011000600; 08022000200; 08144000200

Cal Rosal is a singular population entity in the municipalities of Avià, Berga and Olvan, in Catalonia, Spain.

As of 2025 it has a population of 1,115 people.

Its former factory and convent buildings have been repurposed into an artists' colony called Konvent.

== Other websites ==
https://www.idescat.cat/codis/?id=50&n=9&c=08022 Berga Statistic population https://www.idescat.cat/codis/?id=50&n=9&c=08144 Olvan Statistic population
