= Castell =

Human tower performed in Catalonia, Spain

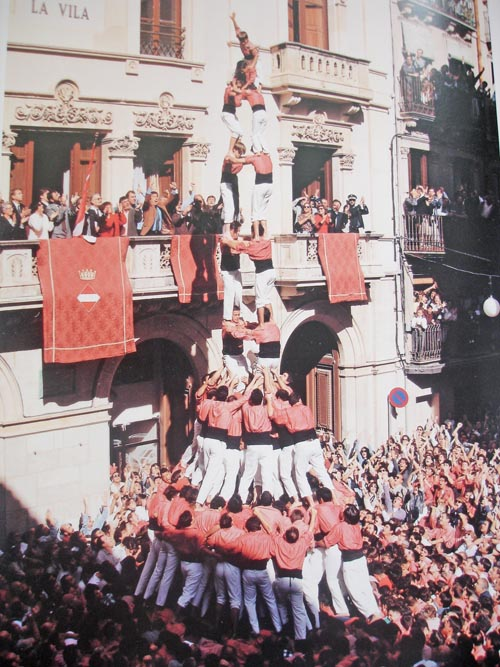
- Castell (2 de 9 amb folre i manilles) in Valls
- Medium: Human towers
- Originating culture: Catalan
- Originating era: 18th century–present

Human towers
- UNESCO Intangible Cultural Heritage
- Country: Spain
- Reference: 00364
- Region: Europe and North America

Inscription history
- Inscription: 2010 (5th session)
- List: Representative

A castell (Catalan: [kəsˈteʎ]; lit. 'castle') is a human pyramid built traditionally at festivals in southern Catalonia (Spain), now also found in the rest of Catalonia, and in the Balearic Islands.

At these festivals, several colles castelleres (teams that build towers) attempt to build and then dismantle a tower's structure. On 16 November 2010, castells were declared by UNESCO to be amongst the Masterpieces of the Oral and Intangible Heritage of Humanity.

== Origin ==
Although based on the earlier traditional Muixeranga of Algemesí in Valencia, the tradition of castells within Catalonia originated in the Ball dels Valencians (Valencian Dance) in the town of Valls, near the city of Tarragona, first documented in 1712. Over the course of the 18th century, they spread to other towns and cities in the area, including Vilafranca del Penedès and Tarragona, though it was not until the last 50 years that the practice of building castells began to spread to the rest of Catalonia. Interest in castells began to grow in the 1960s and 1970s. In the 1980s, the inclusion of women in the formerly male-only discipline ushered in the second època d'or (golden age) of castells; the presence of women is credited with allowing castells to be built lighter and stronger, enabling the construction of previously undreamed-of 9- and 10-story castells.

While in Catalonia, the Ball dels Valencians began to focus more on the acrobatic nature of building ever taller human towers, their more religious and allegorical predecessors retain their traditions: the Muixeranga, which is performed in the Valencian city of Algemesí, and in other places in the Valencian Land and Catalonia, where it is often called the moixiganga.

In 2015 the Coordinadora de Colles Castelleres de Catalunya hosted 99 groups, including Castellers de Vilafranca and Minyons de Terrassa, who were able to construct the tallest human tower to date, the "4 de 10" (10 levels of people with four in each level).

These icons of Catalan culture and sports were featured in the opening ceremony of the Barcelona 1992 Summer Olympics.

== The castell ==
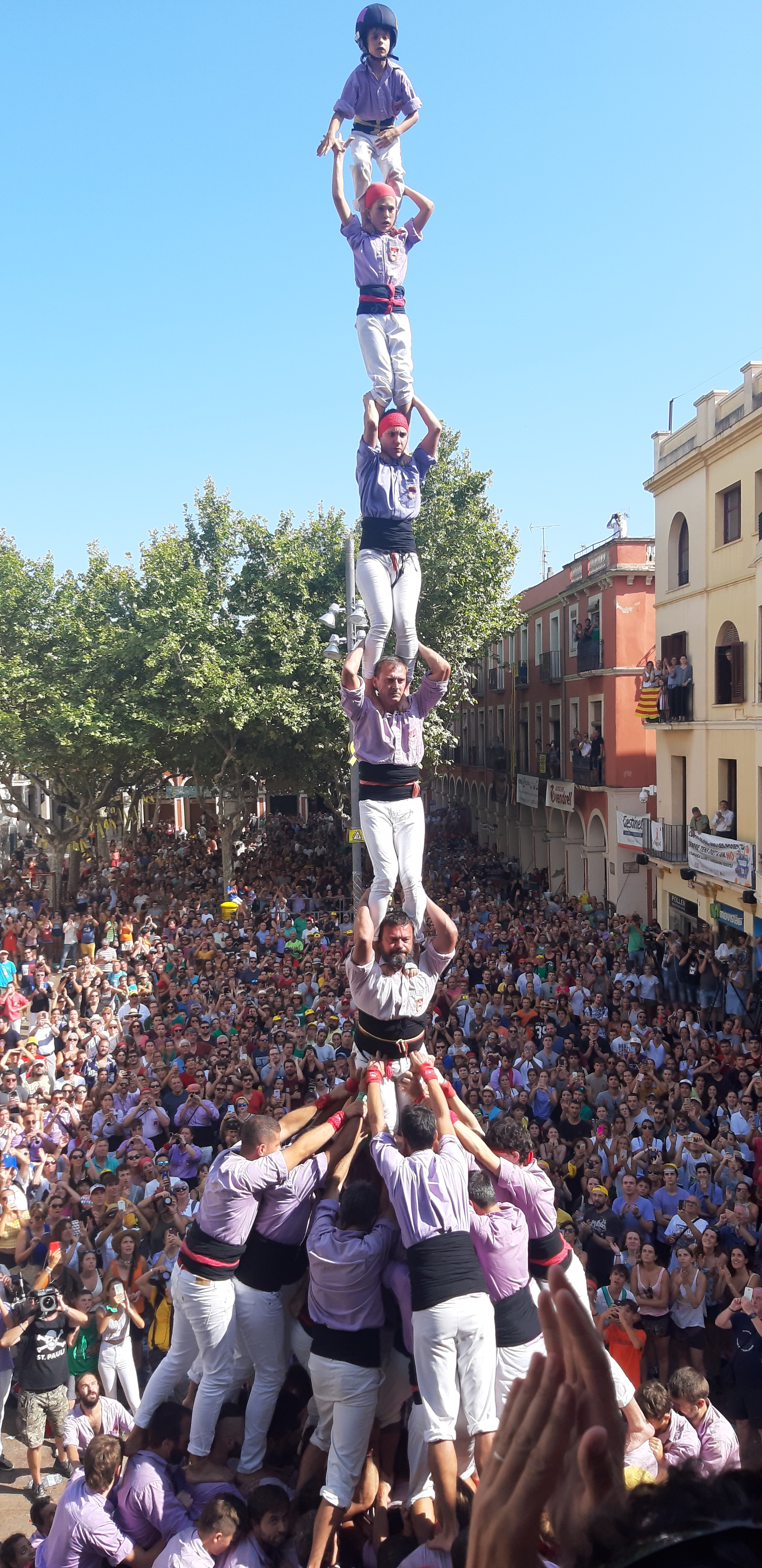
Pilar de 8 amb folre i manilles (Colla Jove Xiquets de Tarragona, 2019)

In Catalan, the word castell literally translates into castle, while in English its meaning is specifically that of a human tower.

A castell is considered a success when assembly and disassembly can be done in complete succession. The assembly is complete once all castellers have climbed into their designated places, and the enxaneta climbs into place at the top and raises one open hand. The enxaneta then climbs down the other side of the castell, after which the remaining levels of castellers descend in highest to lowest order until all have reached safety.

Aside from the people who climb to form the upper parts of the tower, others are needed to form the pinya, or bottom base of the castell, to sustain its weight. Members of the pinya (most often men) also act as a 'safety net' if the tower structure collapses, cushioning the fall of people from the upper levels. It is not uncommon—when not in competitions—for other colles to assist in the pinya when a small colla is attempting a specially demanding structure in terms of people needed.

The castell is built in two phases. First, the pinya— the base of the tower — is formed. People forming higher levels of the tower move to a position from which they can easily get to their places in the tower. This is done slowly and carefully, and as subsequent base levels are completed the castellers in the pinya determine if their base is solid enough for construction to continue. Then, when the signal to proceed is given, bands begin to play the traditional Toc de Castells music as a hush comes over spectators of the event. The upper layers of the tower are built as quickly as possible in order to put minimal strain on the lower castellers, who bear most of the weight of the castell. The disassembly of the castell, done amidst the cheering of the crowd, is often the most treacherous stage of the event.

A castell can also be aixecat per sota ("raised from below"). In this technique, rather than the lower levels being built first with subsequent layers added on top, the top layers are formed on the ground and then hoisted into the air level by level, with each successive layer being formed underneath. This is regarded as taking a great deal of practice, skill, and strength.

== Attire ==
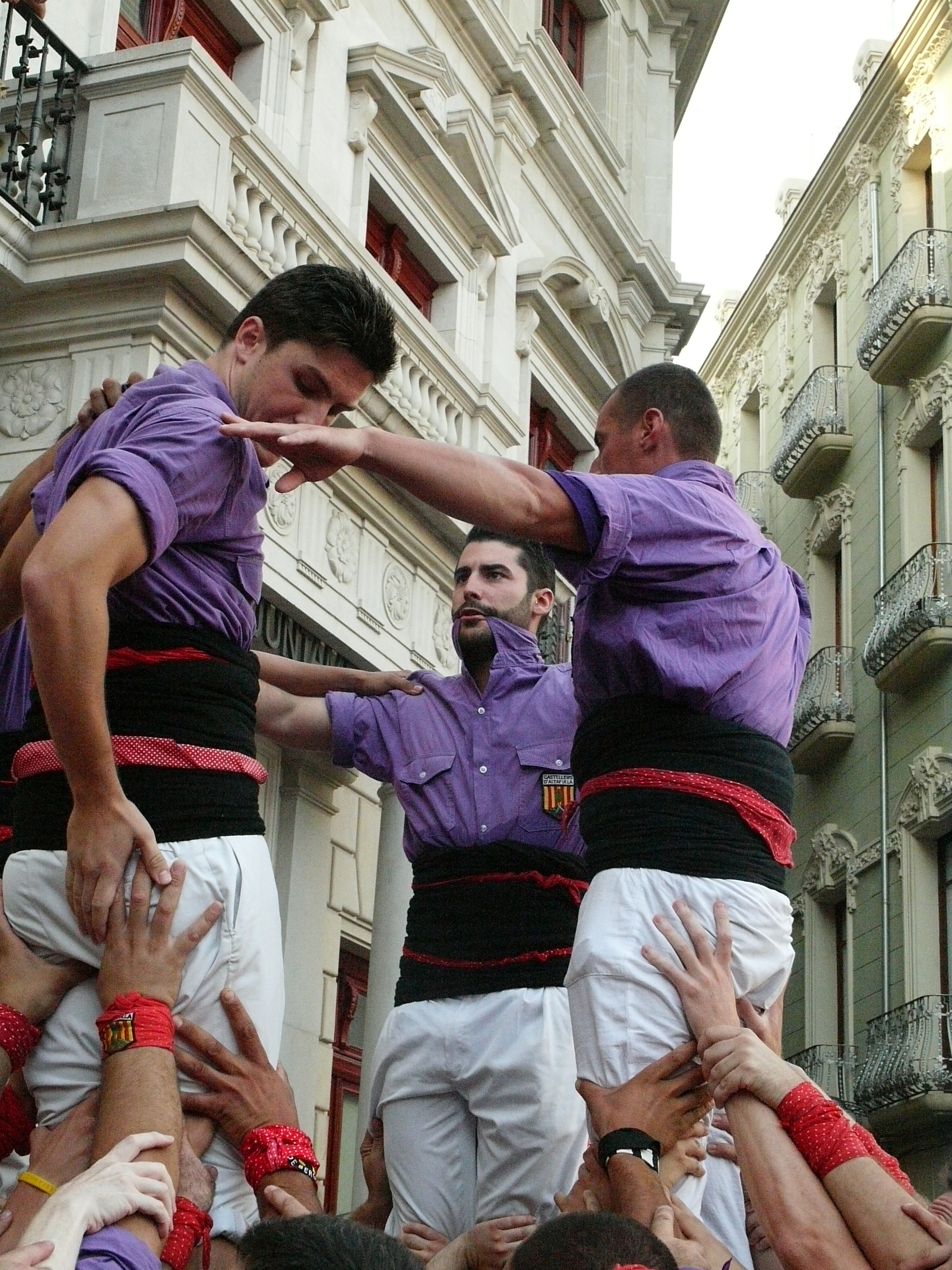
Three castellers in Reus wearing traditional uniforms with white pants and a sash used as a support and handhold.

Typically castellers wear white trousers, a black sash (faixa), and a shirt in their collaʼs color, with the team's emblem. For instance, Castellers de Barcelona team wear red shirts, while Castellers de Vilafranca wear green shirts and are often called els verds (the greens). Castellers also usually wear one or more bandanas (mocadors), usually red with white spots and the team's emblem, for various purposes including to hold the faixa in place, to provide an additional handhold, to tie back hair, or to protect the top of the head.

The sash (faixa) is the most important part of their outfit, representing the tradition as a whole. The sash is also believed to support the lower back, and it is used by other castellers in the team as a foothold or handhold when climbing up the tower. This tasselled piece of cloth varies in length and width and depends on the casteller's position inside the tower and also on choice. The length of the sash ranges from 1.5 to 12m and usually is shorter for those higher up in the castell. Performing castellers always go barefoot when climbing, so as to avoid injuries, for greater sensitivity when balancing, and for better feel and grip.

== Structure ==
The arrangement of castellers can be into a multi-tiered structure and the highest has a height spanning of nine or ten people from ground up. The motto of castellers is "Força, equilibri, valor i seny" (Strength, balance, courage and common sense). This motto is taken from a verse of Els Xiquets de Valls by Josep Anselm Clavé, a Catalonian politician and composer.

- Strength: Castellers at the base of the tower are usually stocky, while those further up, though generally lighter and agile, must still be fairly strong. The first castellers were peasants that were accustomed to holding great weights and were under much physical exertion.
- Balance: Supporting those above themselves in the castell, whilst relying on those below for support, requires a strong sense of balance and trust.
- Courage: The most important characteristic for castellers, especially for young children forming the highest levels of the castell.
- Common sense: Rehearsing and performing requires a great deal of planning and reasoning. Any error can cause the structure to fail and break apart.

== Safety ==
Accidents are rare during the construction of a castell; however, as in every other crowded cultural event, ambulances are stationed nearby in case a person needs immediate attention. Fatal accidents do occur; the most recent was on 15 September 2011 when a man broke his second cervical vertebrae after falling from a castell. On 23 July 2006, in Mataró, a young casteller fell off the formation of a castell and died. This led to the requirement of specially designed helmets for all children participating in castells. Prior to this, the last death of a participant was in 1983 in Torredembarra. There have only ever been four recorded mortalities from participating in castells. Since the introduction of the helmets, there have been no cases of traumatic brain injury among children participating in castells.

== Terminology ==
=== Castell nomenclature ===
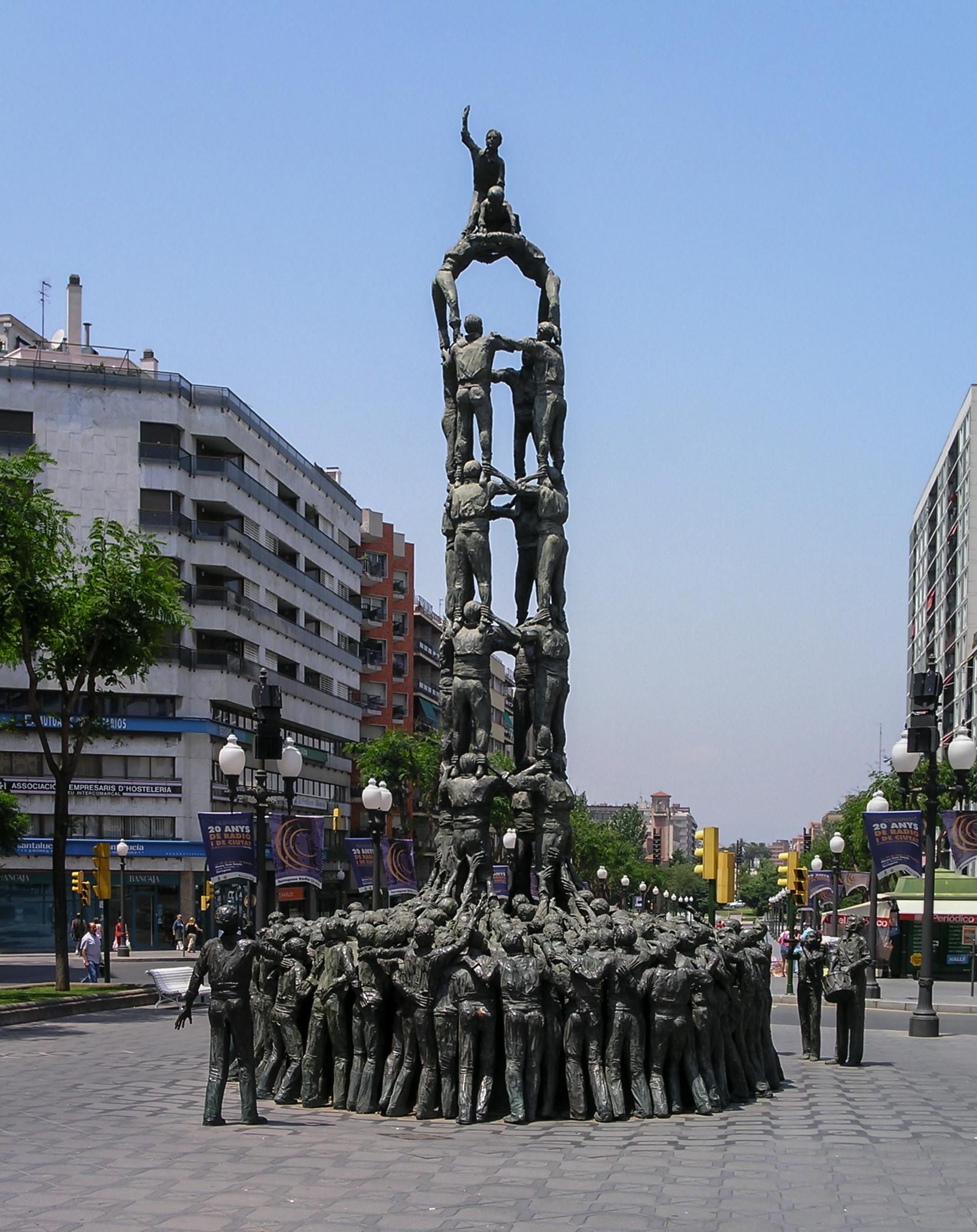
Castellers monument in Tarragona.

Castells are primarily described by the number of people in each level of the tronc and the total number of levels and, where applicable, any special construction technique used. Levels are composed of between one and five individuals standing on the shoulders of the level below.

Common terms indicating the number of people for each level of a tower:

- Pilar ("pillar"): one person per level
- Torre ("tower"): two people per level
- Tres : three people per level
- Quatre : four people per level
- Cinc : five people per level (and so on)

Castells with more than four people per level are composite structures. For example, the levels of a cinc are not pentagons; instead, the cinc amounts to a tres and a torre fused together (3 + 2 = 5), each level forming a figure-eight shape if seen from above.

Numbers of levels most commonly built:

- Sis : six levels high
- Set : seven levels
- Vuit : eight levels
- Nou : nine levels
- Deu : ten levels

For example, a tres de vuit (abbreviated 3d8) denotes a tower with three people per level and eight levels. (Only the first five levels will have three people per level. The pom de dalt, see below, is reckoned as making up the top three levels.)

Very high towers and ones with a small number of people on each level normally need extra support from the base or bottom levels. These base levels are frequently indicated as part of the name of the tower. Three kinds of base levels are most commonly used:

- Pinya ("pine cone/bulk"): the ground-level base, often composed of several hundred people. Most towers have this, so it is not mentioned in the name. Instead, when a tower is built without a pinya, it is described as net ("neat" or "simple"). There is furthermore an expression in Catalan called "fer pinya" which is taken from its usage in castells. Literally translating into "making a pinecone" in English, this phrase is not only meaningful for castellers but for the people of Catalonia as a whole. To be a part of a pinya you do not need to be an experienced casteller, anybody can be a part of the base. Thus, "fer pinya" represents the idea of coming together in solidarity to accomplish a goal or task.
- Folre ("cover"/"lining"): a second-level base built on top of the pinya. Another layer of reinforcement above the pinya for the castell. It is always mentioned when used.
- Manilles ("handles"/"handcuffs"): a third-level base built on top of the second-level folre. A manille is often use for particularly tall castells (nine or ten levels). It is always mentioned when used.
- When tall castells are built, for extra challenge, without a folre and/or manilles that would usually be used due to their height, this is also mentioned, e.g. torre de 9 sense manilles (torre of 9 without manilles), which can also be called torre de 9 amb folre (torre of 9 with folre, i.e. with only a folre and no manilles)

The term amb l'agulla ("with the needle") refers to a high column of one person per level which is built inside the main tower. When the castell is being dismantled, the agulla must remain standing until the outside part of the castell is already down.

Terms denoting special construction techniques include:

- aixecat per sota ("raised from below"), in which the castell is built not from the bottom up by climbing, but from the top down with each successive level being boosted onto the shoulders of castellers who join at ground level;
- caminant ("walking"), in which a castell (usually a pilar), and its pinya if any, slowly walk as a unit across the ground. This is often done to enter the site at the beginning of an actuació.

Another aspect of castell nomenclature refers to how successfully the tower was completed. Four terms are used:

- Descarregat : the tower is completed to the top—that is, to the point where the enxaneta raises his or her hand in the aleta gesture—and successfully dismantled
- Carregat : the tower is completed to the top but falls during dismantling
- Intent : the tower falls before it is completed to the top
- Intent desmuntat : the tower is not completed to the top but is successfully dismantled (because the tower is observed to be unstable and likely to fall)

=== Examples ===
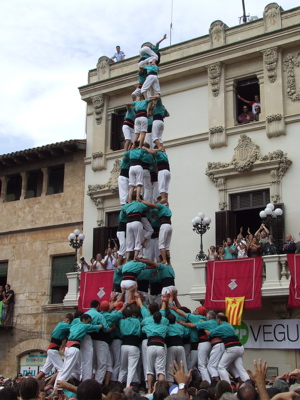
Fully constructed

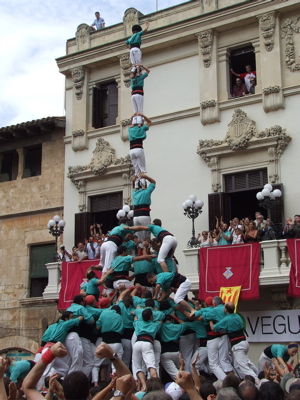
Remaining agulla after dismantling of upper levels

The Castellers de Vilafranca's Quatre de nou amb folre i l'agulla (Four in nine with folre and agulla)
- Pilar de sis: one person per level in a tower of six levels. If nothing else is mentioned, this means that the tower had the bottom base-level pinya (as always) and was successfully dismantled (descarregat).
- Torre de nou: two people per level in a tower of nine stories.
- Cinc de nou amb folre: five people at each level in a tower of nine levels, with a second-level folre built on top of the base-level pinya.
- Quatre de nou amb agulla: four people at each level in a tower of nine levels, with an interior agulla.
- Quatre de nou net:four people at each level in a tower of nine levels without folre ( a second-level base ) built on top of the pinya ( ground level base ).
- Tres de deu amb folre i manilles: three people per level in a tower of ten levels, with a second-level folre and a third-level manilles.
- Quatre de deu amb folre i manilles: four people per level, with additional support in the second and third levels. This difficult construction was achieved for the first time in November 2015, by the Minyons de Terrassa team.

=== Castellers and parts of a castell ===
- cap de colla ("team leader"): The head of each team, who decides which castells the team is ready to attempt and directs the construction of the castells from the ground. The cap de colla is always accompanied by a number of assistants and advisers.
- cap de pinya ("base leader") one of the team leaders's assistants, who takes particular responsibility for the allocation of places in the pinya, ensuring even force is applied to the base of the castell. The cap de pinya will direct members of the pinya to different positions, depending on the size of the castell.
- tronc ("trunk"): The vertical part of the castell.
- baix ("base"): the casteller standing on the ground at the bottom of one of the columns of castellers making up the tronc, and supporting the segon on his or her shoulders. Short, stocky, and strong.
- segon ("second"): One of the castellers standing on the shoulders of the baixos, making up the second storey of the tronc. Likewise, the subsequent storeys of the trunk are called terços, quarts, quints, sisens, and setens ("thirds, fourths, fifths, sixths, sevenths"). As the pom de dalt makes up the top three storeys of the castell and there has never yet been a castell taller than ten storeys, there have never been any vuitens ("eighths").
- agulla ("needle," not to be confused with the agulla mentioned above): A casteller who stands in front of and facing a baix, holding the lower legs of the segon and relaying information and instructions to the members of the pinya.
- contrafort ("buttress"): stands behind the baix and holds embraces him/her for support.
- crossa ("crutch"): fills in the space between baixos and supports their arms on his/her shoulders. Generally short and slender.
- mans ("hands"): stands behind the contrafort and supports the buttocks of the segon.
- vent ("wind"): stands between and just outside two baixos and supports the legs of the segons standing on both.
- lateral: stands to one side of a baix and supports one leg of the segon from the side.
- cordó ("cordon"): Each concentric layer of the pinya. The ones in direct contact with the tronc are the primer cordó, those behind them are the segon cordó, and so forth. Members of the outer cordons are designated by the person they are positioned behind and the number of their cordó. For example, the person behind the primeres mans is the segones mans; behind that person is the terceres mans, and so forth.
- tap ("stopper"): inserted into the pinya to fill a gap and make the pinya more solid.
- pom de dalt ("top group"): The top three levels of the castell: dosos, aixecador, and enxaneta.
- canalla ("children"): Those who make up the top levels of the castell. They are usually children but can also be women.
- dosos ("the twos"): A level consisting of two people, supporting and locked together by the aixecador and surmounted by the enxaneta. These castellers are generally children.
- aixecador ("riser") or acotxador ("croucher"): The person who squats with one foot on each of the dosos, locking them together and so providing a stable platform for the enxaneta, who stands astride the aixecador. Almost always a child.
- enxaneta ("rider") : The topmost casteller, a child. When the enxaneta raises his or her hand in a four-finger gesture called the aleta, this indicates that the construction of the castell is complete.

== Music ==
Traditional music is an important part of the technique of castells, and most colles castelleres have a band of performers of traditional instruments, namely the gralla, a loud, shrill reeded woodwind similar to an oboe, and the timbal or tabal, a drum.

The main piece of music is called the toc de castells, and is played while each castell is built. The practical importance of the music is to provide a signal of the phases of the construction of the castell for the benefit not only of the crowd, but of the castellers themselves, since those inside the castell cannot see it as it is being built, and in fact are instructed to avoid looking up for safety reasons. The duration of the toc also provides a time limit in competition. The toc begins once the layers of the base and the first non-base layer of the castell are complete, and the next level is climbing. A tremolo followed by the highest note of the toc is played when the enxaneta reaches the top and performs the aleta to complete the construction. An early arranged score for the traditional toc de castells was composed by the noted Catalan cellist Pau Casals in 1900.

Other pieces of music include the toc de matinades, played during a procession through the town or neighbourhood on the morning of a performance; the toc d'entrada a plaça, played as the castellers enter the square where the performance will take place; and the toc de vermut, played at the end of the performance.

== The Human Tower Museum of Catalonia in Valls ==
The Món Casteller Human Tower Museum of Catalonia, in the town of Valls, opened in 2023. The project is designed as a place of reference for the human tower universe where experiences can be lived out.

== Colles castelleres ==
=== In Catalonia and Catalan-speaking regions ===
- Xiquets de Tarragona
- Passadors de Sant Adrià del Besòs
- Capgrossos de Mataró
- Castellers de Vilafranca
- Castellers de la Vila de Gràcia
- Colla Joves Xiquets de Valls
- Colla Vella dels Xiquets de Valls
- Minyons de Terrassa
- Castellers de les Gavarres
- Castellers de Sabadell
- Bordegassos de Vilanova
- Castellers de Caldes de Montbui
- Castellers d'Esplugues
- Castellers de Sants
- Castellers de Barcelona
- Angelets del Vallespir
- Castellers de les Roquetes
- Castellers de Lleida
- Brivalls de Cornudella
- Castellers de Poble Sec
- Salats de Súria
- Castellers de Mollet
- Colla Castellera Jove de Barcelona
- Nois de la Torre
- Colla Jove de l'Hospitalet
- Colla Castellera Nyerros de la Plana
- Marrecs de Salt
- Margeners de Guissona
- Xiquets de Serrallo
- Colla Castellera de Sant Pere i Sant Pau
- Tirallongues de Manresa
- Castellers de Cornellà
- Castellers de Sant Feliu
- Colla Castellera Xiquets d'Alcover
- Colla Jove Xiquets de Tarragona
- Castellers de Rubí
- Castellers de Castelldefels
- Torraires de Montblanc
- Castellers d'Altafulla
- Colla Jove Xiquets de Vilafranca
- Nens del Vendrell
- Moixiganguers d'Igualada
- Castellers de Sant Cugat
- Sagals d'Osona
- Margeners de Guissona
- Matossers de Molins de Rei
- Castellers de Santa Coloma
- Colla Castellera de Figueres
- Castellers de la Sagrada Família
- Castellers de Terrassa
- Colla Jove de Castellers de Sitges
- Castellers de l'Alt Maresme
- Castellers de Cerdanyola
- Minyons de l'Arboç
- Castellers de Badalona
- Castellers del Riberal
- Castellers d'Esparreguera
- Xics de Granollers
- Al·lots de Llevant
- Castellers de Solsona
- Castellers de Caldes
- Castellers de Berga
- Castellers de Mallorca
- Xiquets de Reus
- Castellers de Viladecans
- Castellers de Sarrià
- Ses Talaies de Formentera
- Vailets de Gelida
- Xerrics d'Olot
- Xicots de Vilafranca
- Castellers d'Andorra (Andorra)
- Castellers de Gavà
- Carallots de Sant Vicenç dels Horts

=== Colles castelleres universitàries (teams of college castellers) ===
- Arreplegats de la Zona Universitària (Barcelona)
- Bergants del Campus de Terrassa (Terrassa)
- Emboirats de la UVIC (Vic)
- Engrescats de la URL (Barcelona)
- Ganàpies de la UAB (Cerdanyola del Vallès)
- Grillats del CBL (Castelldefels)
- Llunàtics de la UPC de Vilanova
- Marracos de la UdL (Lleida)
- Passerells del Tecnocampus (Mataró)
- Pataquers de la URV (Camp de Tarragona)
- Penjats del Campus Manresa (Manresa)
- Trempats de la UPF (Barcelona)
- Xoriguers de la UdG (Girona)

=== Colles exteriors (outside the Catalan-speaking region) ===
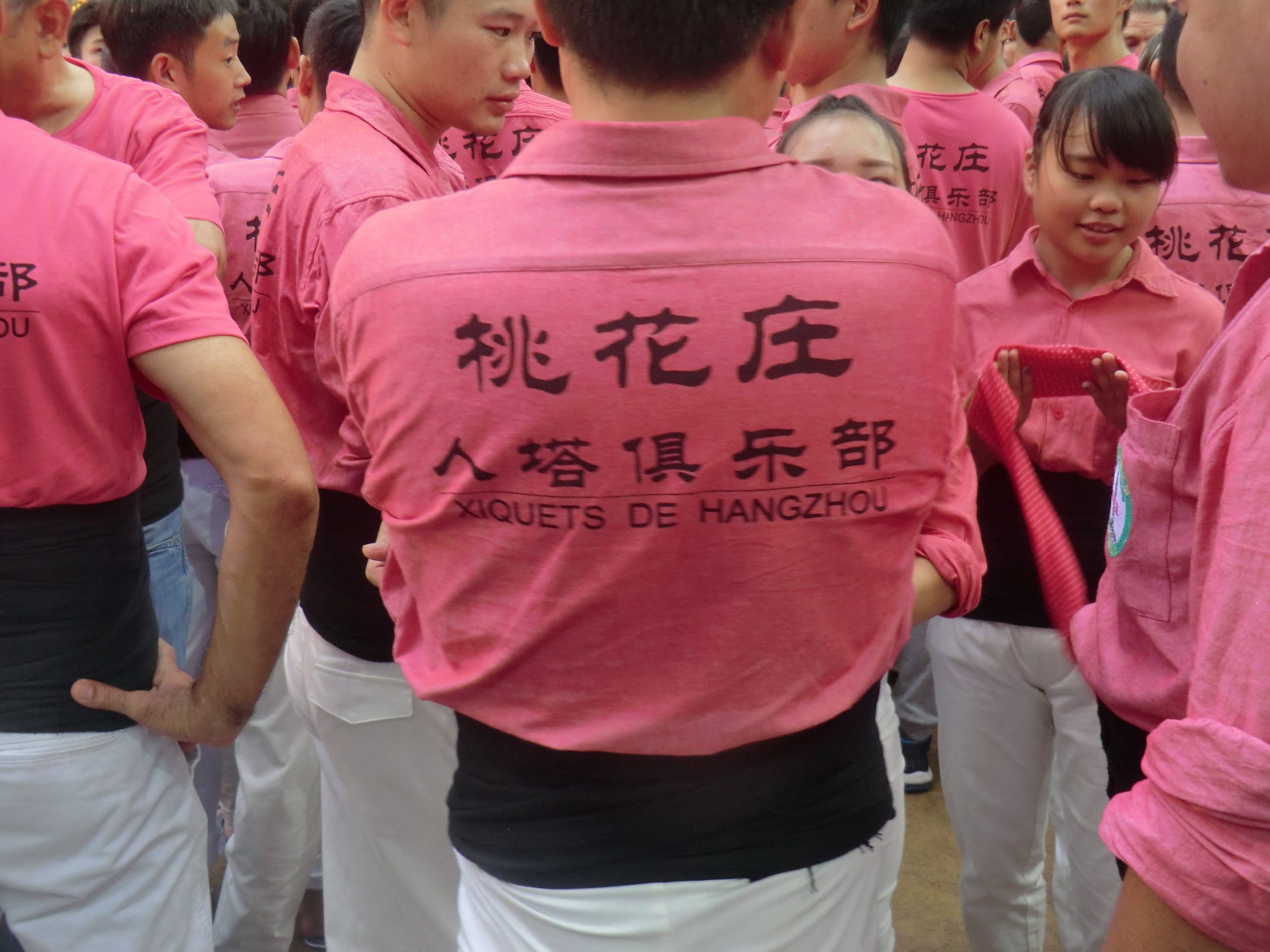
Xiquets de Hanghzou (2016)

- Castellers de Sydney, (Sydney, Australia)
- Castellers de Berlin, (Berlin, Germany)
- Xiquets Copenhagen (Copenhagen, Denmark)
- Castellers de París (Paris, France)
- Castellers of London (London, England)
- Colla Castellera d'Edinburgh, (Edinburgh, Scotland)
- Xiquets de Hoorn (Hoorn, Netherlands)
- Castellers d'Irlanda (Dublin, Ireland)
- Castellers de Montréal (Montréal, Québec, Canada)
- Castellers de Lo Prado, (Santiago, Chile)
- Koales de Melbourne, (Melbourne, Australia)
- Mannekes de Brussel·les (Brussels, Belgium)
- Xiquets de Hangzhou, (Hangzhou, China)
- Colla Pobl Taf, (Pontypridd, Wales)

== See also ==
- Acrobalance
- Acrobatic gymnastics
- Dahi Handi, a similar tradition in India.
- Gymnastic formation
- Human tower (gymnastic formation)
- Human pyramid
- Muixeranga
