= Castellers de Vilafranca =

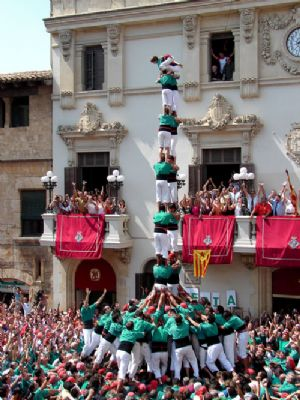
First torre de nou amb folre carregada in history, Castellers de Vilafranca

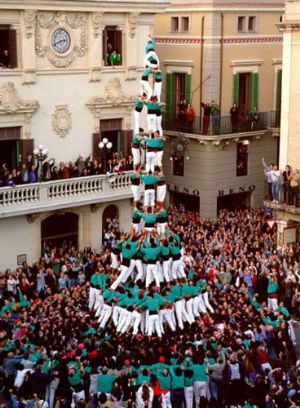
First tres de deu amb folre i manilles carregat in history, Castellers de Vilafranca

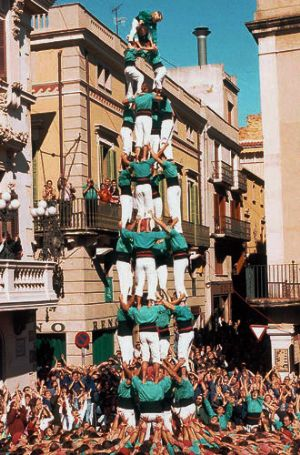
First quatre de nou sense folre by Castellers de Vilafranca

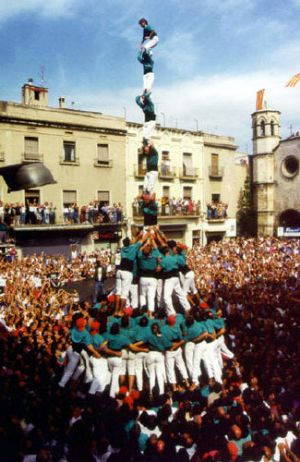
First pilar de vuit amb folre i manilles carregat in the 20th century, Castellers de Vilafranca

The Castellers de Vilafranca (Catalan pronunciation: [kəstəˈʎez ðə βiləˈfɾaŋkə]) is a cultural and sporting association whose main objective is to build castells (human towers).

== History ==
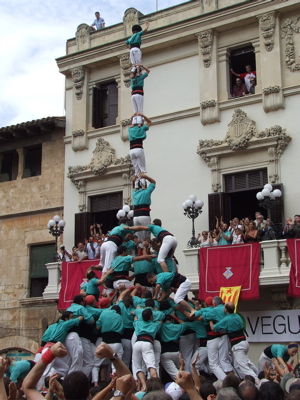
Quatre de nou amb folre i l'agulla, Castellers de Vilafranca

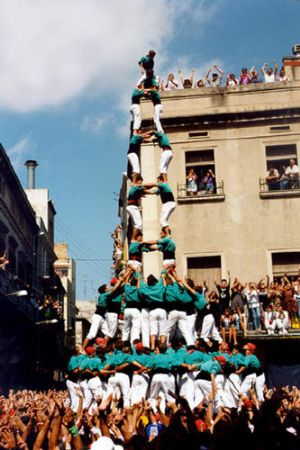
First torre de nou amb folre i manilles descarregada of Castellers de Vilafranca

The Castellers de Vilafranca cultural association was founded in September 1948 by Oriol Rossell. Rossell was responding to the increased interest in human tower building in Vilafranca del Penedès, a Catalan tradition that has evolved since the 18th century "Ball de Valencians", a dance from Valencia.

The group started with seven-level towers, and forged close relationships with casteller groups in other towns. The first caps de colla (Leader/Technical Manager of the group) were Oriol Rossell (1948–1952) and Ramon Sala (1953–1955). The group originally wore rose-coloured shirts, and later red ones.

In 1956, the group became almost inactive due to internal disagreements and disputes. In 1957, it reorganized and elected to wear green shirts, which they still use today. Between 1957 and 1968, seven-level towers were the norm, and the cinc de set was the highest tower achieved. From 1969 to 1974, the group built the first towers in the eight-level category: the torre de set, quatre de vuit, tres de vuit, pilar de sis, and the torre de vuit amb folre.

In 1972, the group won the Concurs de castells de Tarragona, the Human Towers Competition held biennially in Tarragona city in the south of Catalonia. During those years, the caps de colla were Josep Pedrol (1957–1959), Carles Domènech (1960–1961), Joan Bolet (1962–1963), Gabi Martínez (1964–1969), Lluís Giménez (1970–1973) and Gabi Martínez, again (1974).

In 1975, the group underwent an internal restructure, moving away from the almost-exclusive leadership of the cap de colla, to consensual team management of the technical side of tower-building. In 1981, it was decided that team members would no longer be individually paid. This provoked a division in the group.

From 1975 to 1982, eight-level towers were performed frequently. In 1983 and 1984, the group regained its strength in this category and, in 1985, it built the first cinc de vuit. In 1987, they built the first tres and quatre de nou amb folre (carregat), and in 1989 the first completely successful tres de nou amb folre (descarregat) was achieved. In 1990, the first quatre de nou amb folre (descarregat) was built. The cap de colla between 1975 and 1994 was Carles Domènech.

Between 1995 and 2004, the highest towers were achieved: descarregats (completely and successfully dismantled), the torre de nou amb folre i manilles, pilar de set amb folre, pilar de vuit amb folre i manilles, quatre de vuit amb l’agulla, quatre de nou amb folre i l’agulla (the first one in human tower history), cinc de nou amb folre, and tres and quatre de nou amb folre built simultaneously (the first and only time in human tower history). The towers that were carregats (reached the top but collapsed afterwards) were the torre de vuit, quatre de nou, and the tres de deu amb folre i manilles (the first one in human towers history).

The group won the Tarragona Human Towers Competition in 1996, 1998, 2002, 2004, 2006, 2008, 2010, and 2012. In 2005, Castellers de Vilafranca achieved the torre de nou amb folre, which is considered the most difficult tower ever done by any group to date.

Francesc Moreno "Melilla" was the cap de colla between 1995 and 2003, and Lluís Esclassans from 2004 to 2007. David Miret was elected the new cap de colla in December 2007.

In 2010, the Castellers de Vilafranca had about 400 active human tower building members.

=== Castells achieved ===
Castellers de Vilafranca have achieved in their history most of the constructions that have been seen in any performance. You will find below the detailed list of human constructions and the date in which they were topped or dismantled for the first time :

CASTELL	Descarregat (successfully dismantled)	Carregat (collapsed in dismantling)
Tres de nou amb folre i agulla	31 Aug 2009	
Torre de nou amb folre		30 Aug 2005
Tres de deu amb folre i manilles		15 Nov 1998
Quatre de nou amb folre i tres de nou amb folre simultanis	31 Aug 2001	
Torre de vuit neta	1 Nov 2010	1 Nov 1999
Quatre de nou		1 Nov 2002
Quatre de nou amb folre i agulla	1 Nov 1996	1 Nov 1995
Cinc de nou amb folre	1 Nov 1997	30 Aug 1997
Pilar de vuit amb folre i manilles	28 Sep 1997	31 Aug 1995
Torre de nou amb folre i manilles	30 Aug 1995	
Tres de nou amb folre	30 Aug 1989	31 Aug 1987
Quatre de nou amb folre	1 Nov 1990	1 Nov 1987
Quatre de vuit amb l'agulla	8 Oct 1995	
Cinc de vuit	30 Aug 1985	
Torre de vuit amb folre i pilar de set amb folre simultanis	31 Aug 2006	
Pilar de set amb folre	1 Oct 1995	14 May 1995
Tres de vuit amb agulla	29 Aug 1996	
Dos pilars de sis simultanis (un de carregat)	31 Aug 2001	
Torre de vuit amb folre	17 Nov 1974	12 Oct 1973
Tres de vuit	30 Aug 1974	1 Oct 1972
Pilar de sis	30 Aug 1972	19 Dec 1971
Quatre de vuit	30 Aug 1971	12 Oct 1969
Nou de set	11 Dec 1988	
Torre de set	24 Aug 1969	
Tres de set aixecat per sota	25 Nov 1973	
Sis de set	21 Jan 1997	
Cinc de set amb agulla	19 Apr 2008	
Cinc de set	26 Sep 1965	30 Aug 1965
Tres de set amb l'agulla	10 Aug 1996	
Quatre de set amb l'agulla	5 Aug 1954	31 Aug 1953
Tres de set	31 Aug 1949	
Quatre de set	31 Aug 1949	
Torre de sis	16 Jun 1949	
Pilar de cinc	14 Sep 1948	

== Cal Figarot, the group's headquarters ==
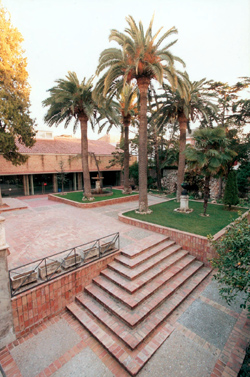
Yard of Cal Figarot, Castellers de Vilafranca headquarters

Cal Figarot is the group's headquarters. The neogothic-style building, built by August Font de Carreres at the end of the 19th century, was acquired in 1983. An adjacent warehouse was bought in 1998, and both buildings were renovated. The warehouse has an interior open space of 600 square metres. Training sessions take place in the courtyard.

== Castellers de Vilafranca in the world ==
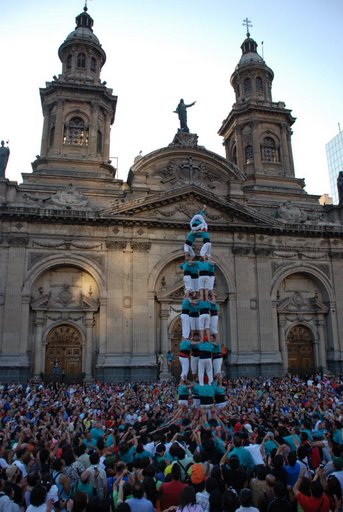
Quatre de vuit in Santiago de Chile, Castellers de Vilafranca

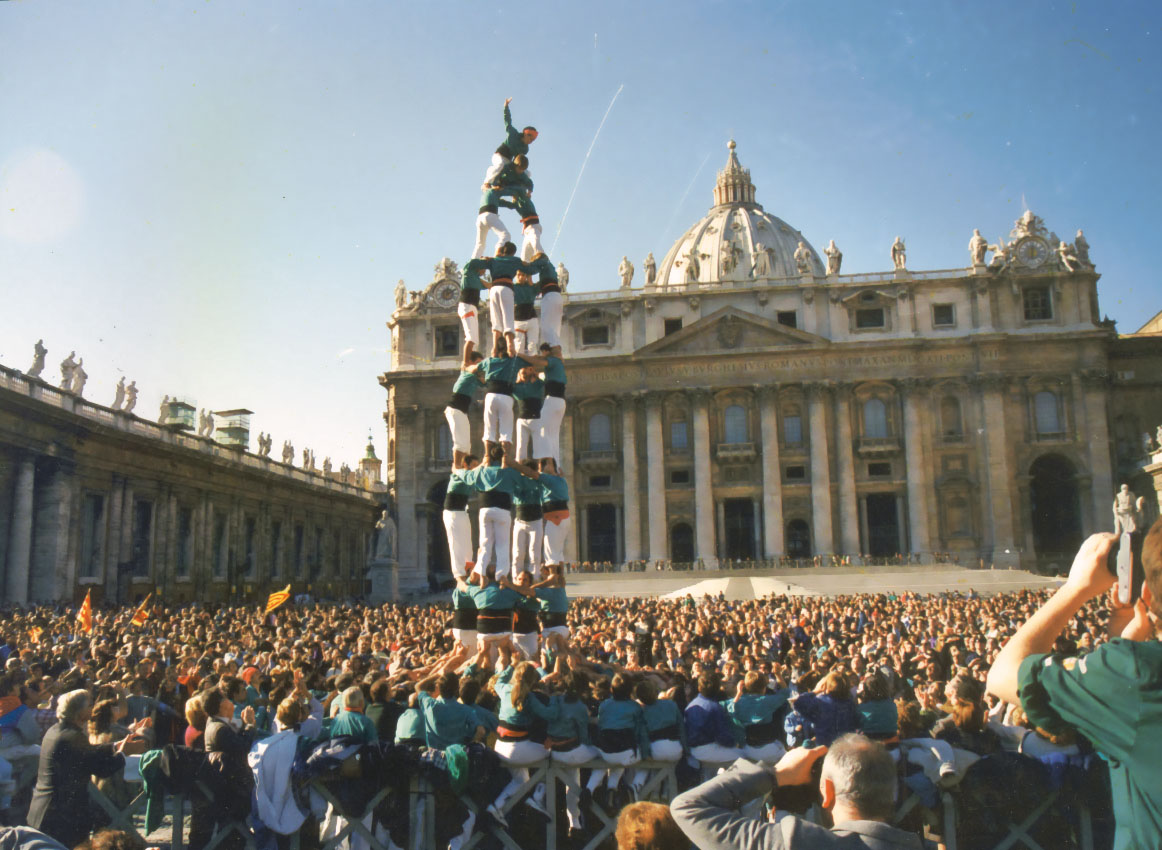
Quatre de vuit in Vatican City, Castellers de Vilafranca

Countries where the Castellers de Vilafranca have performed include France, Italy, Luxembourg, Germany, the Netherlands, Belgium, Denmark, Chile, India, and New York City.

In 1988, they performed in Italy during the celebration of the thousandth anniversary of Catalonia. They performed in the Universal Exposition Seville'92 (1992), during the Catalonia day and in Brussels, Belgium (2010) supporting the nomination of Castells to UNESCO Heritage. The Castellers de Vilafranca also performed in the opening ceremony of the XXV Olympic Games in Barcelona in 1992.

The Castellers de Vilafranca have toured extensively in the Països Catalans (territories in which the varieties of Catalan are traditionally spoken):

- Performances in Northern Catalonia: six times in Perpignan (1970, 1977, 1982, 1989, 1997 and 1998), in Toluges (1970), in Collioure (1984), in Banyuls de la Marenda (1986), three times in Vilafranca de Conflent (1985, 1988, 1989), in the Saint Michel de Cuxa monastery (1985), Prada de Conflent (1988) and in Baó, in the framework of the First meeting of the catalanitat in North Catalonia (2002).
- Four times in Andorra: in Encamp (1971), Andorra la Vella and Sant Julià de Lòria (1976), in Escaldes and again in Andorra la Vella (1983) and Escaldes (1985).
- Two tours in the Valencia Region: the first one was in Ribera del Xúquer (1979), and in the second one (1981) the group performed in Alcoi, Benidorm and Alicante. Subsequently, they performed in Carcaixent (1985), Algemesí (1993, 2000), Castellón (2000).
- One tour in Palma, Majorca (1980) and Manacor, Menorca (2001).
- One tour, already mentioned, in Alghero (1978).

== Gallery ==
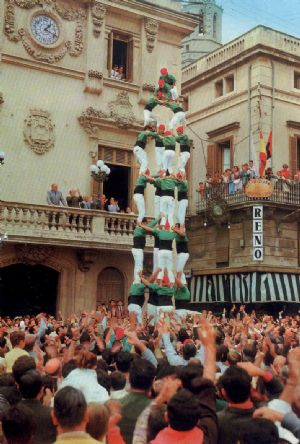
First quatre de vuit carregat by the Castellers de Vilafranca, 12/10/1969

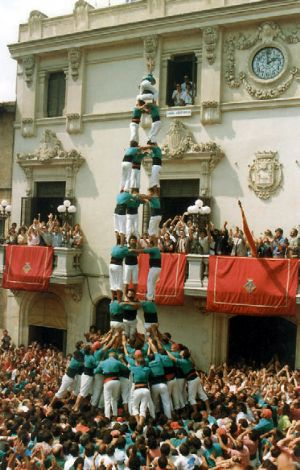
First tres de nou descarregat by the Castellers de Vilafranca, 30/08/1989

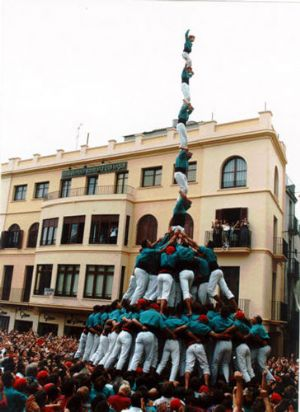
First pilar de vuit descarregat in history, Castellers de Vilafranca, 28/09/1997

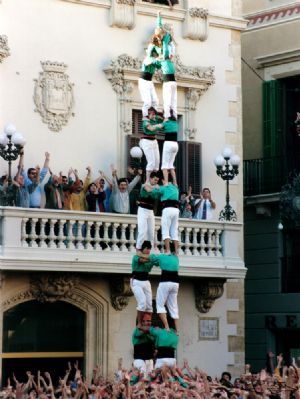
First torre de vuit sense folre carregada in history, Castellers de Vilafranca, 1/11/1999

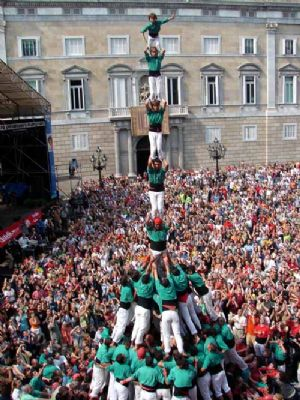
First pilar de vuit amb folre i manilles descarregat in Barcelona, Castellers de Vilafranca, 25/09/2005

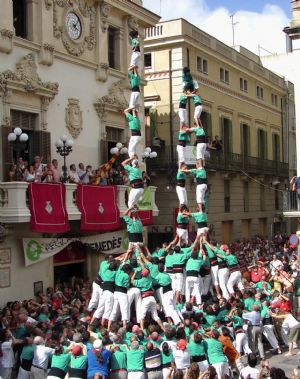
First torre de vuit amb folre and pilar de set amb folre descarregats simultaneously in history, Castellers de Vilafranca, 31/08/2006

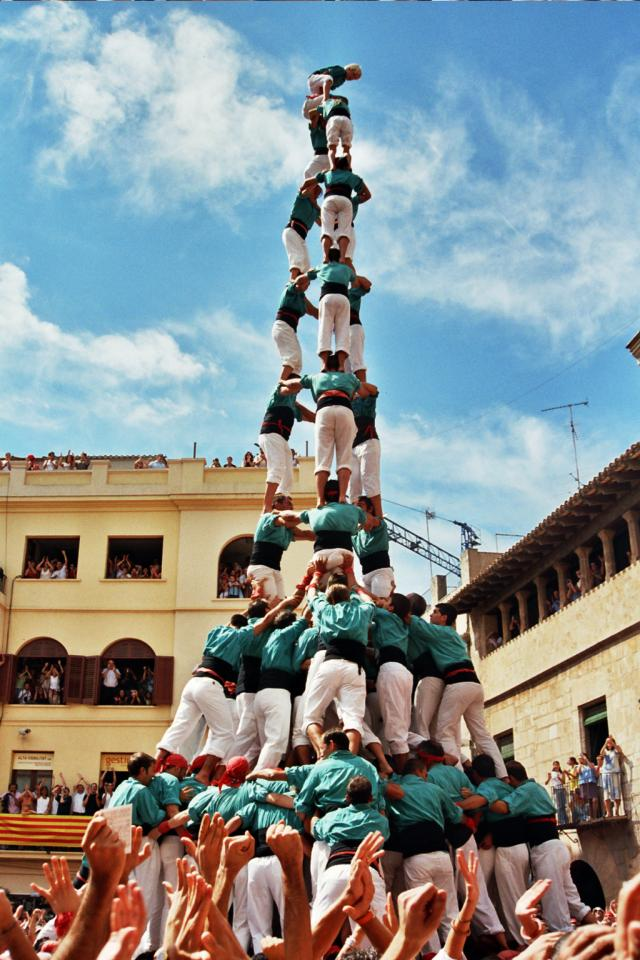
Tres de deu amb folre i manilles by the Castellers de Vilafranca

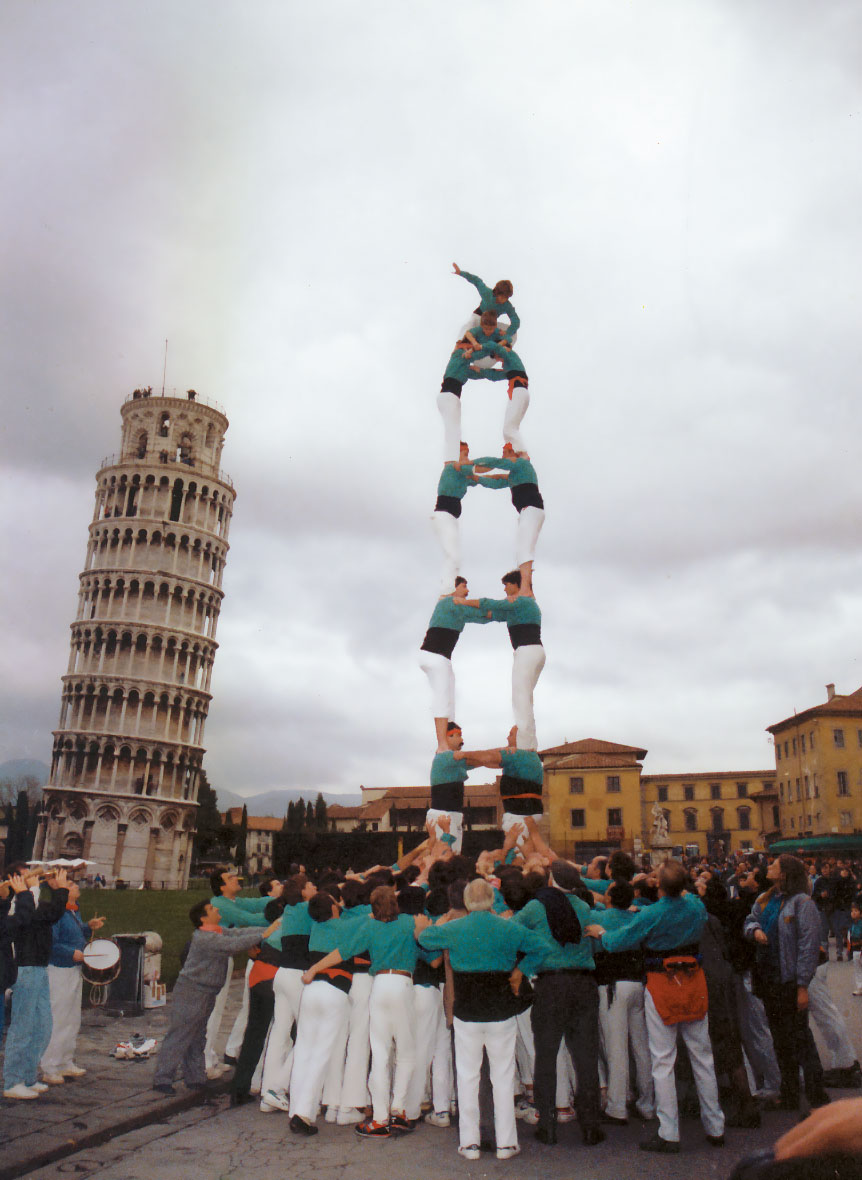
Torre de set in Pisa, Castellers de Vilafranca, 1988

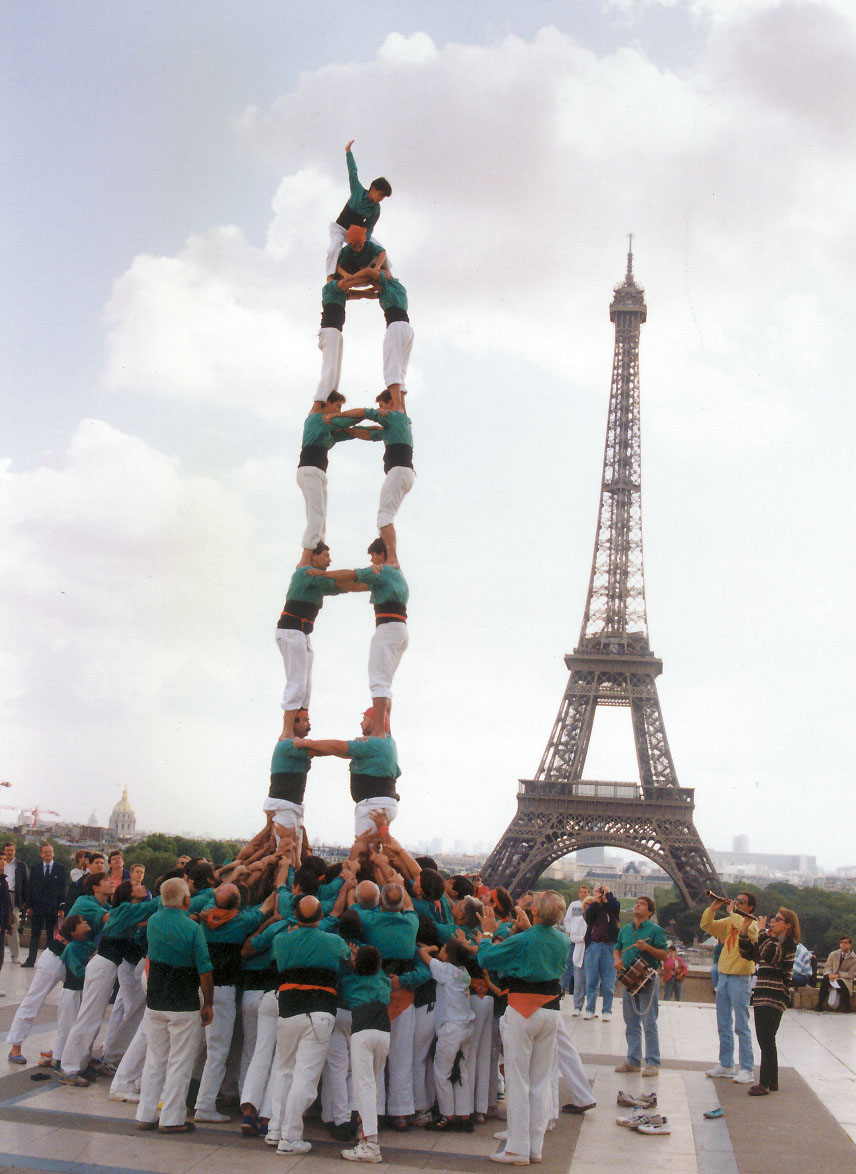
Torre de set in Paris, Castellers de Vilafranca, 1993

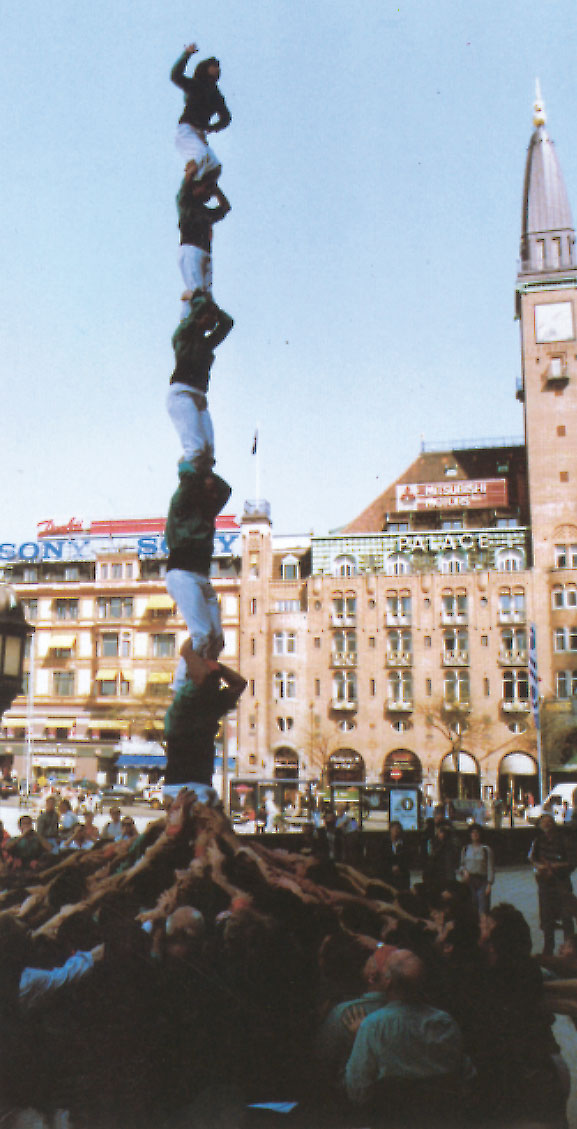
Pilar de sis in Copenhaguen, Castellers de Vilafranca, 1996
