= La Mercè =

Annual Barcelonan festival

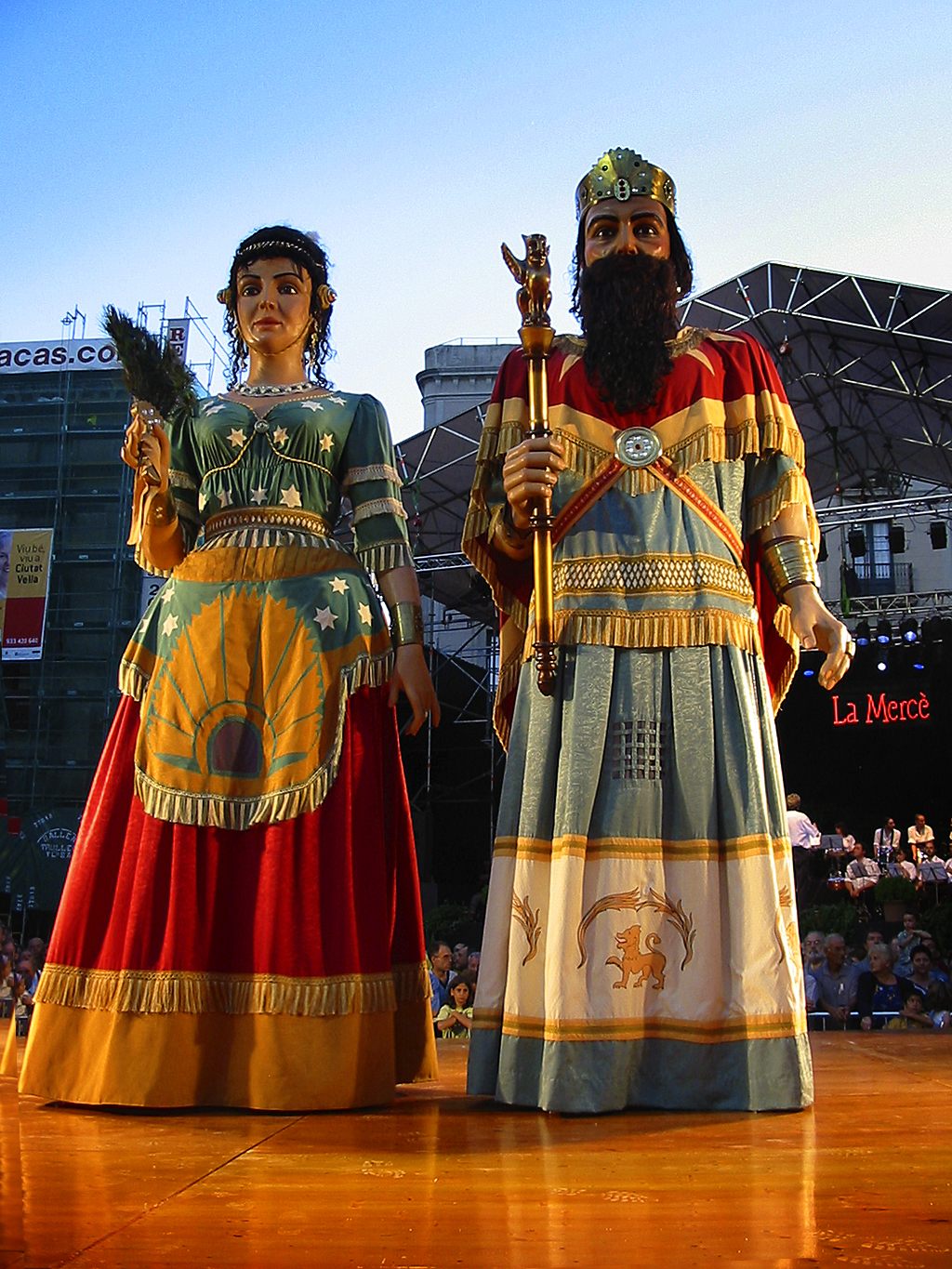
- Gegants in the feast of La Mercè, 2003
- Dates: 23–28 September
- Website: barcelona.cat/lamerce/en

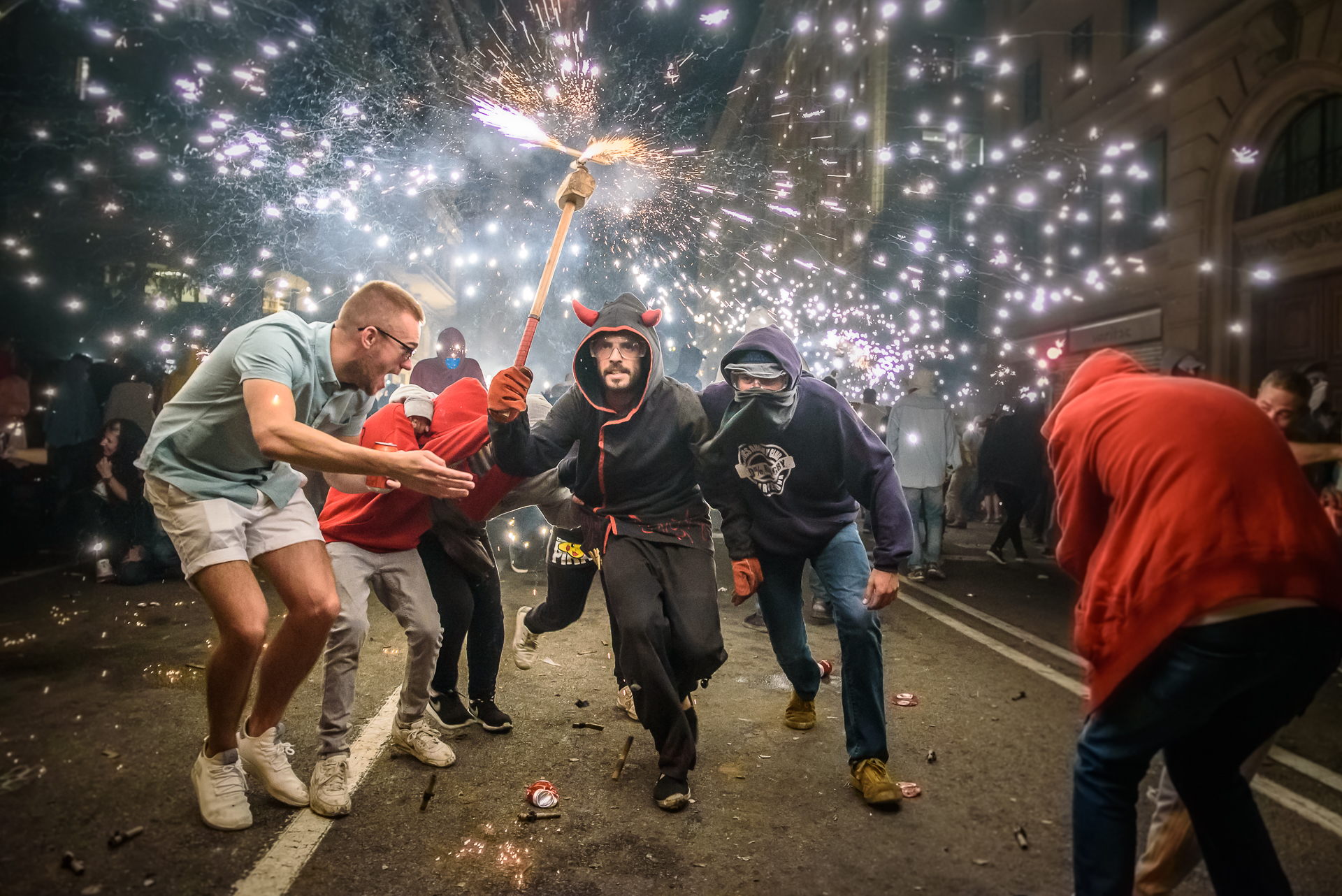
Correfoc

La Mercè (Catalan pronunciation: [lə məɾˈsɛ]) is the annual festival (Catalan: festa major) of the city of Barcelona in Catalonia, Spain. It has been an official city holiday since 1871, when the local government first organized a program of special activities to observe the Roman Catholic feast day of Our Lady of Mercy (Catalan: La Mare de Déu de la Mercè). Although the actual feast day is September 24, the festivities begin a few days beforehand.

Some of the most important features of the festival were introduced in the year 1902, when parades included papier maché "giants" known as gegants i capgrossos and a popular dance from Empordà that was becoming popular throughout Catalonia: the Sardana. The holiday has enjoyed immense local popularity ever since.

Among more recently introduced traditions are the annual Catalan Wine Fair, a special correfoc, a 10 km race and the pyro-musical, a display featuring synchronized fireworks, water fountains and music conducted at the base of the Montjuïc mountain.

== History ==
The celebration of La Mercè has religious origins, honoring the Virgin of Grace (Mare de Déu de la Mercè), patron saint of the archdiocese of Barcelona, and co-patroness—along with Saint Eulàlia—of the city. In Catalan, the word mercè has meanings related to service, help, a sense of compassion, and loving mercy. In the Gothic Quarter of Barcelona, there is a basilica dedicated to the Virgin, where a wooden image of her is venerated.

The festival has been celebrated since the Middle Ages. When in 1687 Barcelona suffered a plague of locusts, the Consell de Cent, which then governed the city, voted to ask the Virgin for assistance with their fight against the insects. When the city was delivered from the pestilence, she was named patroness of the city of Barcelona — although this was only recognized by the Pope in 1868. Since that time, an annual festival has been celebrated in the city in honor of the Virgin.

== Activities ==
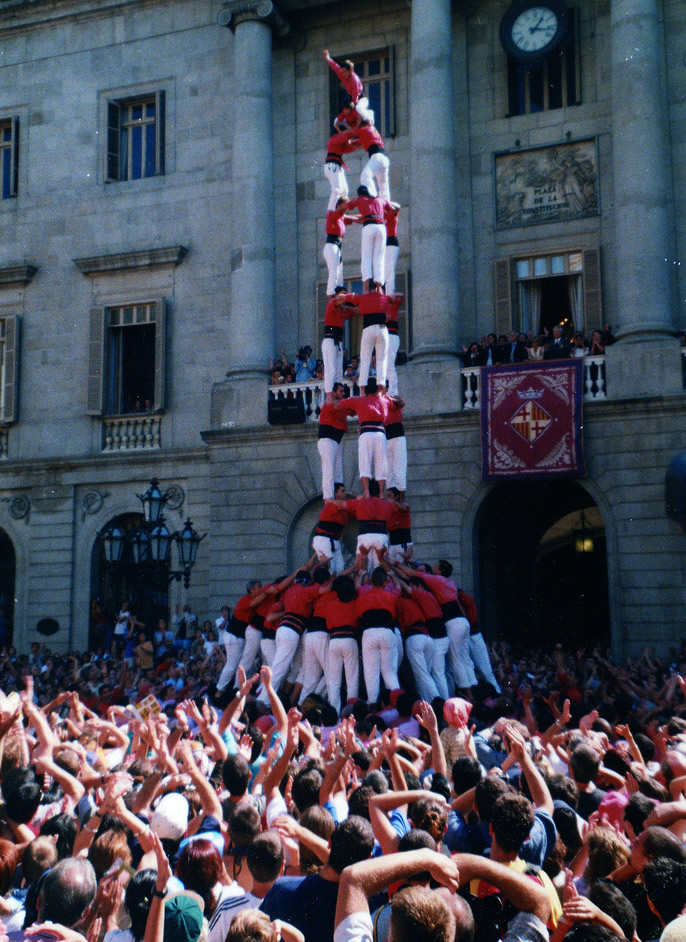
Castellers de Barcelona during La Mercè 2001

During the week-long festival, close to two million people attend cultural and artistic presentations held throughout the city. The most traditional activities of the festival are based in the popular culture of Catalonia. Especially noteworthy are the street parades, originating from the spectacular processions which took place centuries ago for the celebration of Corpus Christi. Each day of the festival is celebrated with its own parade filled with mythical characters and traditional drumming.

There are about 600 events spread throughout the plazas, streets, museums, and parks. All entertainment is free. Barcelona's metro trains run all night during the festival. Street theater is a distinct element of the artistic events. Dance, circus, bands, fringe, and touring shows make up the bulk of the events. In order to bring Barcelona's people closer to different cultures, each year, through the "Guest City" program, another city from elsewhere in the world is invited to present its culture and artists. In 2013 the Guest City was Vienna.

=== Castellers ===
Castellers are human towers and a prominent part of La Mercè. Castells, Catalan for castles, are a cultural phenomenon particular to Catalonia and consist of erecting human towers. This tradition originated at the end of the 18th century in Valls, Province of Tarragona, when rival groups of people called colles began to compete in constructing the different kinds of human towers.
