= Marrecs de Salt =

Casteller group from Girona, Catalonia

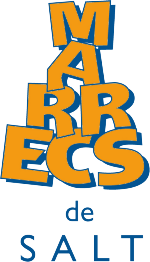
- Foundation: 1995 (baptized in the 1996)
- Shirt color: Blue Ter
- Location: Salt, Girona
- Premises: Naus Guixeres, 8 Factoria Cultural Coma-Cros; C. Sant Antoni, 1
- Coordinates: 41°58′41″N 2°47′44″E
- Group leader: Iruna Rigau
- President: Sebastià Morató
- Best towers: 3 in 9 with double base, 2 in 8 with double base, 5 in 8, 7 in 8, 3 in 8
- Best performance: 5 in 8, 3 in 9 with double base, 2 in 8 with double base, Pillar of 6 (crowned) (07/23/2017 in Salt)
- Highlighted performance: Festa Major de Salt (July); Fires i festes de Sant Narcís, Girona (October)
- Official website: www.marrecs.cat

Marrecs de Salt (Catalan pronunciation: [məˈrɛɡz ðə ˈsal]) is a group of castellers (human tower builders) from Salt, Girona (Catalonia), founded in 1995. They are also to be considered as the local group in Girona, together with their university counterpart: Xoriguers de la UdG. They are one of the seven active groups in the province of Girona, and since the dissolution of Castellers de l'Albera, also the oldest. Their best human tower is the 5 in 8 and their best performance was on 27 October 2013 for the performance of Sant Narcís in the city of Girona, were they completed the 4 in 8, the 2 in 8 with double base, the 3 in 8 and the pillar of 6. Their shirt is blue standing for the river Ter, which flows through both Salt and Girona, as well as other regions of the province.

== History ==
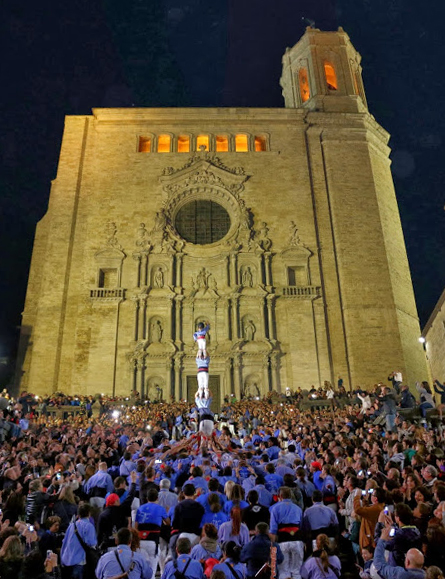
Pillar of the Cathedral, Girona

The group was founded in 1995, mainly influenced by a performance by Castellers de Terrassa and Castellers d'Esparreguera in Plaça del Vi, in Girona on the celebrations of Sant Narcís. Their first public appearance was on 5 January 1996 in Salt, where they crowned a pillar of 4 and completed a pillar of 4 raised. They got baptized on 14 April 1996 in Salt with Castellers de Terrassa and the disappeared Ganxets de Reus being their godparents. On this day Marrecs completed the 4 in 6 with wedge, crowned the 2 in 6 and completed the 3 in 6, while their godparents completed various towers of 7 levels.

In the first years of the group, their rehearsals took place in public buildings with other uses such as La Farga school or the local sports pavilion and the first year they used cafè de Can Pep as their gathering social club. The group got better quickly reaching basic structures of seven levels, but the 4 in 7 with wedge and the 5 in 7 were not reached until 1997, which was also the first year to perform in the walking pillar of the cathedral performance. In 1998 they moved to their premises in Coma-Cros and completed their first 3 in 7 raised. The 2 in 7 was completed in 1999, completing what was then considered the full range of seven level towers.

The first time they completed a tower of eight levels was in 2001 in plaça del Vi of Girona, where they completed the 4 in 8 and crowned the 3 in 8, so far being the only group that begins building towers of eight levels, building two in the same performance. In 2002, Marrecs and Castellers de Sabadell became godparents of Xerrics d'Olot. This year saw a crowned pillar of 6 and until 2006 they did not succeed completing their first 3 in 8. In 2007, during the town's festivities of Salt, it was the first time they completed the 3 in 8, the 4 in 8 and the 2 in 7 together in a single performance.

In 2011 the group moved to their current premises in Naus Guixeres which is also in Coma-Cros and in 2012 they built their first 2 in 8 with double base, which ended up being only crowned, together with completed 3 in 8 and 4 in 8, building three towers of eight levels together in the same performance for their first time. This performance was overtaken three times during 2013: completing the hat-trick (which in the field stands for the 3, the 4 and the 2 in 8 in the same performance) by completing for the first time the 2 in 8 with double base in July, summing up the crowned pillar of 6 at the beginning of October, and finally completing the pillar of 6 in the Diada de Sant Narcís, on 27 October. On 26 October 2014, also on the Sant Narcís, they crowned their first 5 in 8. Lately Marrecs have baptized some other groups of castellers that were recently created: in 2013 they baptized Esperxats de l'Estany having Castellers de Figueres as co-godparents and in 2014 they baptized Vailets de l'Empordà together with Minyons de Terrassa and Castellers de l'Alt Maresme together with Capgrossos de Mataró. There's another pending godson group: Minyons de Santa Cristina, to be co-godparented with Sagals d'Osona.

== Performing abroad ==
Marrecs have performed outside Catalunya in several occasions.

- Lingen. Germany, 1997
- Ceret and Toulouse. France, 1997
- Arles. France, 1998
- Hall in Tirol and Innsbruck. Austria, 1998
- Alghero. Italy, 2000
- Copenhagen. Denmark, 2001
- Baho. France, 2005
- Palma. Balearic Islands, 2005
- (Navarre) Pamplona. Navarra, 2007
- Perpignan. France, 2007
- (Basque Country (autonomous community)) Hondarribia and Donosti. Euskadi, 2008
- Nimes. France, 2011

== Remarkable performances ==
The following table displays the performances that have been historical milestones for the group:

Towers	Date	Performance	Town
3 in 8, 5 in 8 (crowned), 2 in 7	26 October 2014	Sant Narcís	Girona
4 in 8, 2 in 8 with double base, 3 in 8, pillar of 6	27 October 2013	Sant Narcís	Girona
4 in 8, 3 in 8, 2 in 8 with double base, pillar of 6 (crowned)	6 October 2013	Diada de Marrecs	Salt
4 in 8, 2 in 8 with double base, 3 in 8	28 July 2013	Festa Major	Salt
4 in 8, 2 in 8 with double base (crowned), 3 in 8	28 October 2012	Sant Narcís	Girona
4 in 8, 2 in 7, 3 in 8	29 July 2007	Festa Major	Salt

== Festivities ==
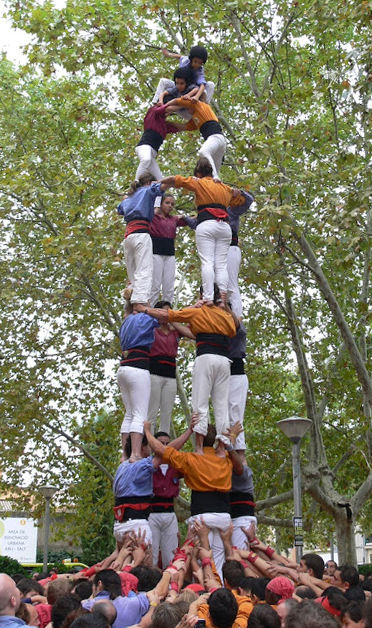
Fraternity 4 in 7 in Salt

The calendar Marrecs follow each year has five special highlights: two annual ones in Salt (Festa Major and Colles de l'Eix), two annual ones in Girona (Sant Narcís and the walking walking pillar of the cathedral) and the Human Tower Competition, held in Tarragona biannually every even year and to which they have attended seven times until 2014. The Festa Major performance in Salt falls at the end of July and it marks the end of the first stretch of the season. It is the most important performance held in Salt.

Colles de l'Eix is a brotherhood performance taking place each September and it always involves Marrecs with Tirallongues de Manresa, Castellers de Lleida and Sagals d'Osona performing alternatively in Salt, Manresa, Lleida and Vic, the respective home towns, which are united by the Eix transversal (Catalan for "cross axis") since this road was built in 1997. Starting on its very first edition back in 1999 in Manresa, it is a tradition to end the performance with a brotherhood 4 in 7, a tower build with a quarter of the base and one row of each of the participating groups, making with the different colors of the shirts (blue, striped blue, burgundy and orange), a colourful and unusual tower.

Diada de Sant Narcís is starred by Marrecs and Minyons de Terrassa since 1996, and since 2007 also by Capgrossos de Mataró. Apart from the fact that Marrecs have reached some of their best performances in this festivity, it is specially remarkable some of the milestones by Minyons de Terrassa, which in 1998 completed the first 4 in 9 with single base of the 20th century and their first pillar of 7 with double base and in 2008 their first pillar of 8 with triple base.

The walking pillar of the cathedral, usually takes place on 1 November, and it is celebrated since 1997 in the cathedral of Girona and it is different to any other performance because Marrecs build a tower in the base of the stairway, then they walk a pillar of 4 along the 90 steps and a last tower is built in front of the facade of the cathedral . In 2010, being the last performance of a bad season, the pillar collapsed and it had to be rebuilt just to walk a few steps left, surrounded by the applauses of the audience. The journalist, and member of the group, Ester Bertran released the video Ho portem dins (It is inside us in English), that soon became popular.

Marrecs have participated in seven editions of the biannual Tarragona Human Tower Competition. They became #18 in the 17th edition (1998), #7 in the 19th (2002), #13 in the 20th (2004), #11 in the 21st (2006), #12 in the 22nd (2008), #21 in the 24th (2012) and #16 in the 25th (2014). Their best performance was in 2014, but their best position happened in 2002, with a 7th position thanks to a 4 in 8, a 2 in 7 and an undone attempt of a 3 in 8 and an unprecedented pillar of 6 crowned.

=== Tarragona Human Tower Competition ===
The following table displays the towers made on each edition they have participated until 2014:

Competition	Rounds					Position
Competition	1st	2nd	3rd	4th	5th	Position
2014	3 in 8	2 in 8 with double base (c)	9 in 7	4 in 8	—	16
2012	4 in 8 (c)	2 in 7	5 in 7	—	—	21
2008	2 in 7	3 in 8 (a)	5 in 7	3 in 7 raised	—	12
2006	4 in 8	2 in 7 (ua)	4 in 7 with wedge	2 in 7	—	11
2004	5 in 7	2 in 7	3 in 7 raised	Pillar of 6 (a)	—	13
2002	4 in 8	2 in 7	3 in 8 (ua)	Pillar of 6 (c)	—	7
1998	4 in 7	5 in 7	4 in 7 with wedge	3 in 7 raised (a)	3 in 7 raised (a)	18

- Green = completed; yellow (c) = crowned; red (a) = attempt; red (ua) = undone attempt;

== Towers ==
The best human tower ever built by Marrecs is the 5 in 8. They loaded this tower for the first time in their history on 26 October 2014 in the festivity of Diada de Sant Narcís in Girona The best seasons of the group are 2013 and 2014, in which they have established the 2 in 8 with double base, completed the pillar of 6 and crown their first 5 in 8. The following table displays every single milestone by Marrecs. It shows the date and town where each tower got completed, and if applicable, also the first date and town in where it got only crowned before.

Tower	Date	Performance	Town
2 in 8 with double base	28 July 2013	Festa Major de Salt	Salt
5 in 8 (crowned)	26 October 2014	Sant Narcís	Girona
2 in 8 with double base (crowned)	28 October 2012	Sant Narcís	Girona
3 in 8	29 October 2006	Sant Narcís	Girona
pillar of 6	27 October 2013	Sant Narcís	Girona
4 in 8	28 October 2001	Sant Narcís	Girona
3 in 8 (crowned)	28 October 2001	Sant Narcís	Girona
2 in 7	24 October 1999	Sant Narcís	Girona
pillar of 6 (crowned)	6 October 2002	Human Towers Competition	Tarragona
9 in 7	4 October 2014	Human Towers Competition	Tarragona
3 in 7 raised	18 October 1998	Festivity of Castellers de Sants	Barcelona
7 in 7	1 November 2012	Walking pillar of the cathedral	Girona
5 in 7	29 June 1997	Festivity of Sant Pere	Figueres
4 in 7 with wedge	9 November 1997	Castellers de l'Albera anniversary	La Jonquera
3 in 7 with wedge	18 October 2009	Nyerros de la Plana anniversary	Manlleu
3 in 7	27 October 1996	Sant Narcís	Girona
4 in 7	28 September 1996	Festivity of Riudellots	Riudellots
pillar of 5 raised	27 September 1998	Festivity of Riudellots	Riudellots
pillar of 5	17 August 1996	Performance in Platja d'Aro	Platja d'Aro
pillar of 5 (crowned)	28 July 1996	Festivity of Salt	Salt
9 in 6	27 July 1997	Festivity of Salt	Salt
2 in 6	31 May 1996	Festivity of the Sant Narcís neighbourhood	Girona
2 in 6 (crowned)	14 April 1996	Baptism of Marrecs	Salt
3 in 6 raised	24 August 1996	Festivity of Ripollet	Ripollet
5 in 6	19 May 1996	Festivity of Vilablareix	Vilablareix
4 in 6 with wedge	24 March 1996	Fira de l'embotit	Bescanó
3 in 6 with wedge	11 May 2013	Temps de Flors opening	Girona
3 in 6	23 March 1996	Performance for Tot oci	Girona
4 in 6	3 March 1996	Calçotada marreca	Salt
pillar of 4 raised	5 January 1996	Welcoming for the Three Wise Men	Salt
pillar of 4	5 January 1996	Welcoming for the Three Wise Men	Salt

Gallery of milestone towers
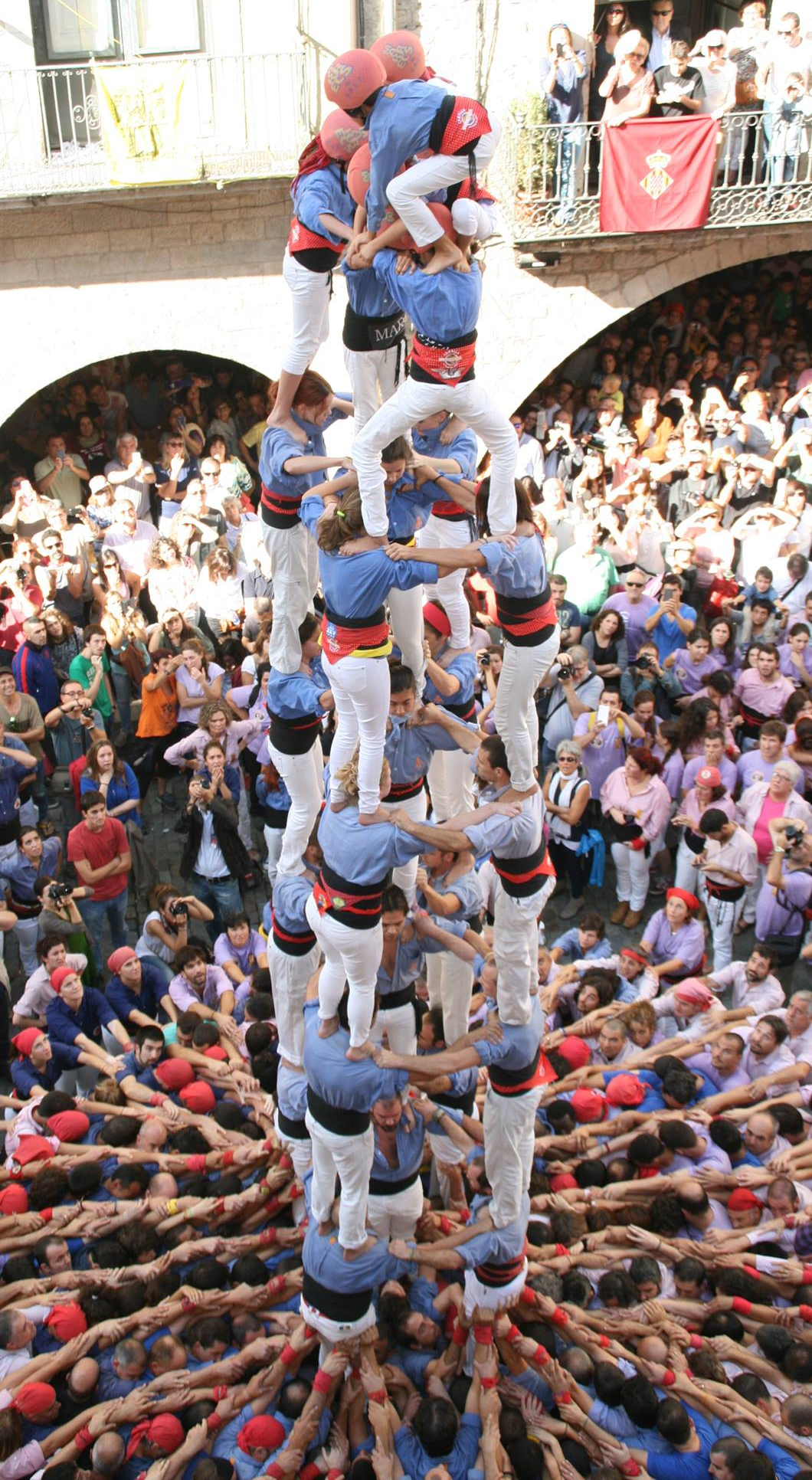
5 in 8 (c), 26 Oct 14

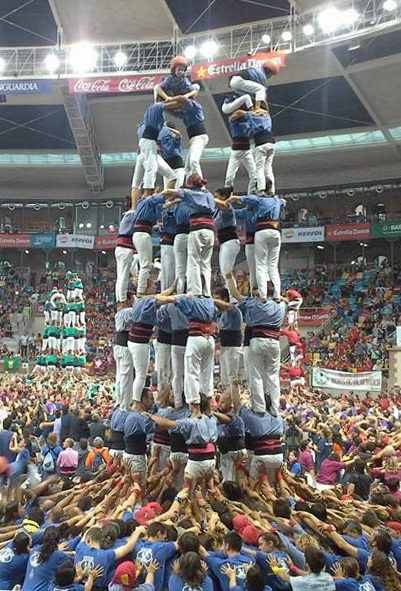
9 in 7, 4 Oct 14

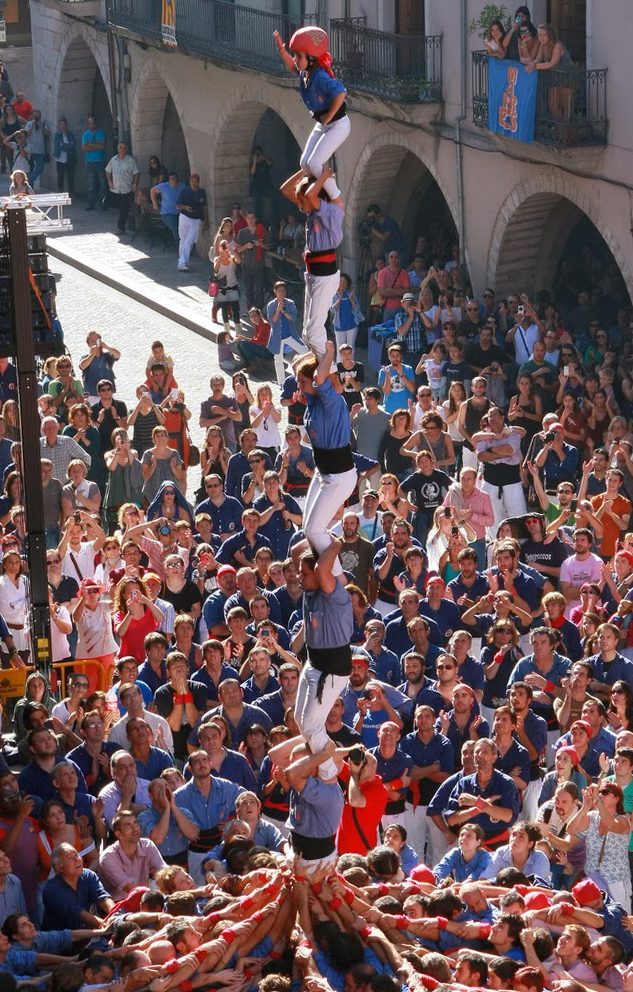
Pillar of 6, 27 Oct 13

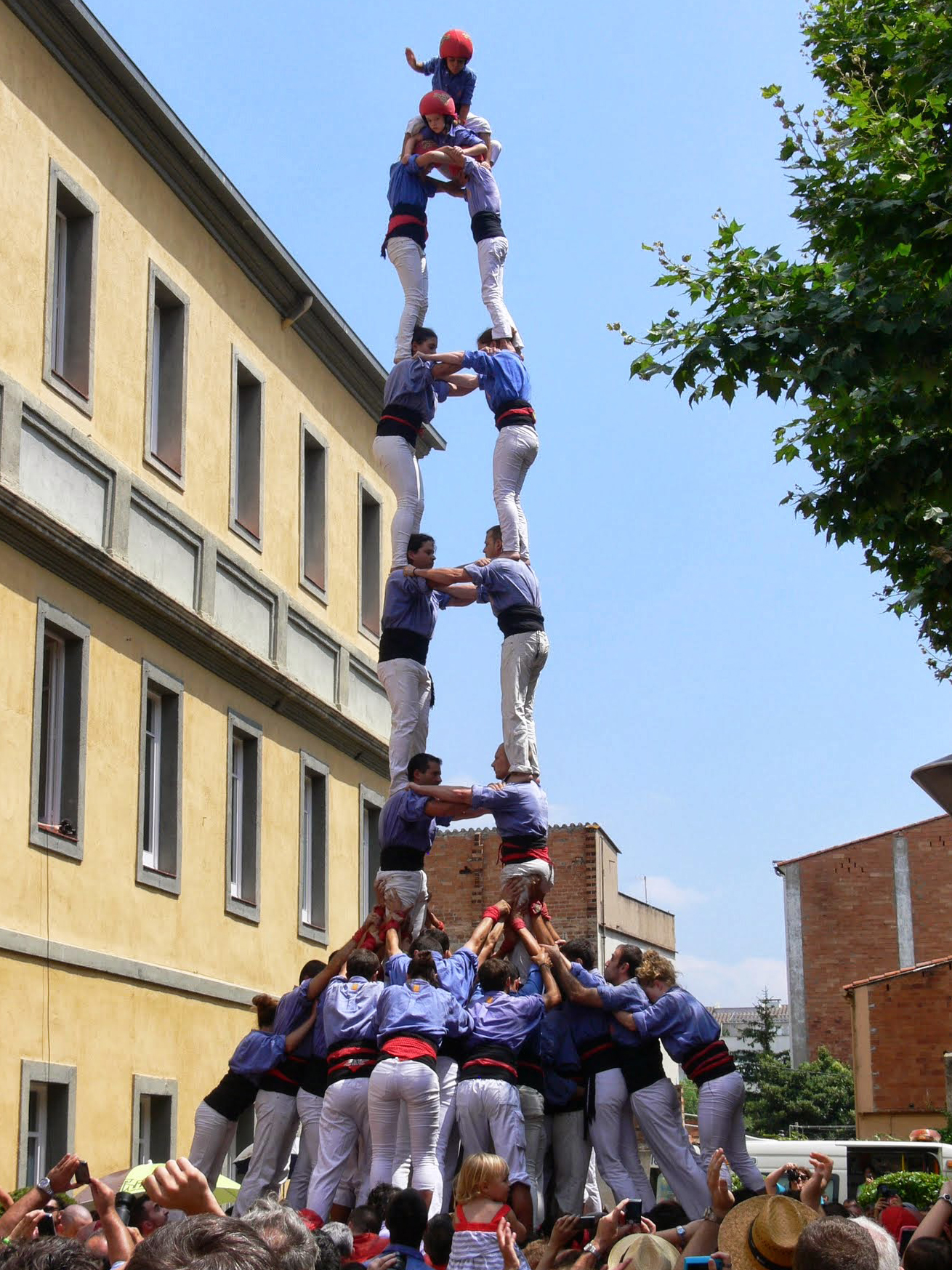
2 in 8 with double base, 28 Jul 13

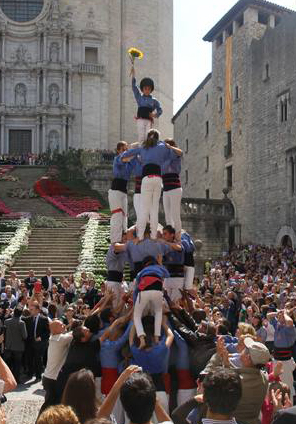
3 in 6 with wedge, 11 May 13

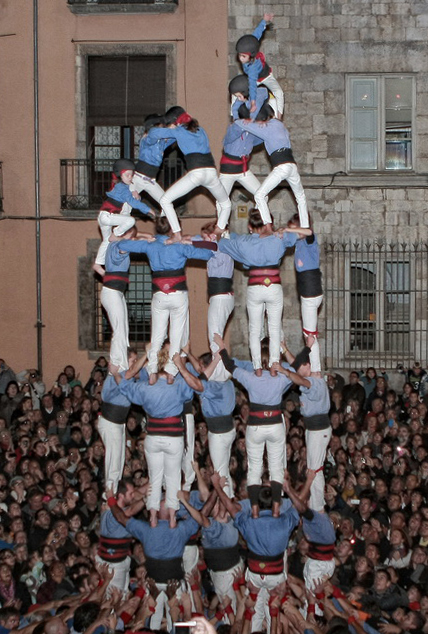
7 de 7, 1 Nov 12

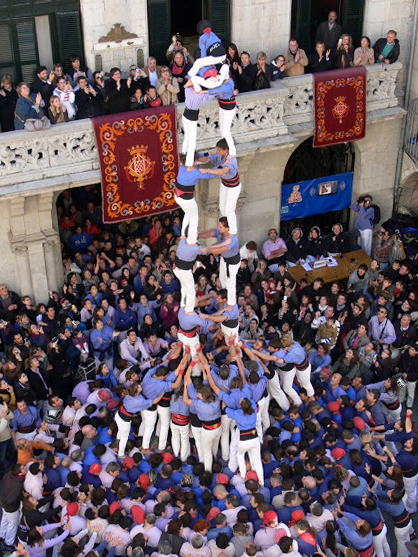
2 in 8 with double base (c), 28 Oct 12

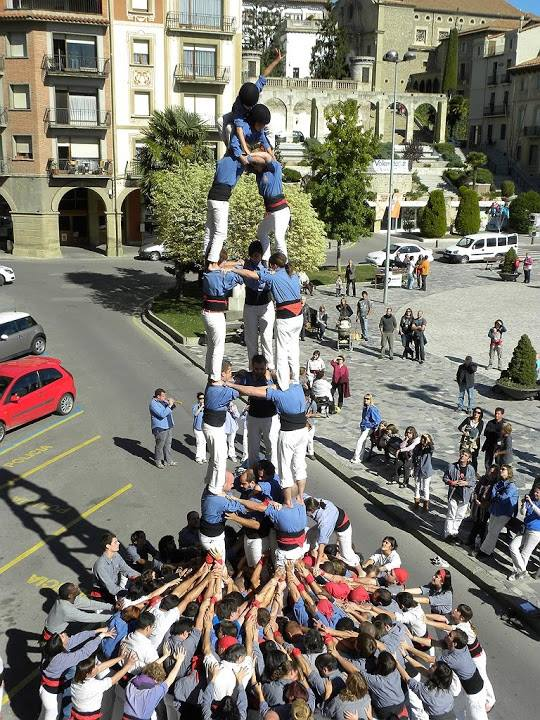
3 in 7 with wedge, 18 Oct 09

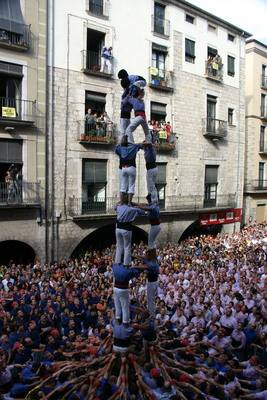
3 in 8, 29 Oct 06

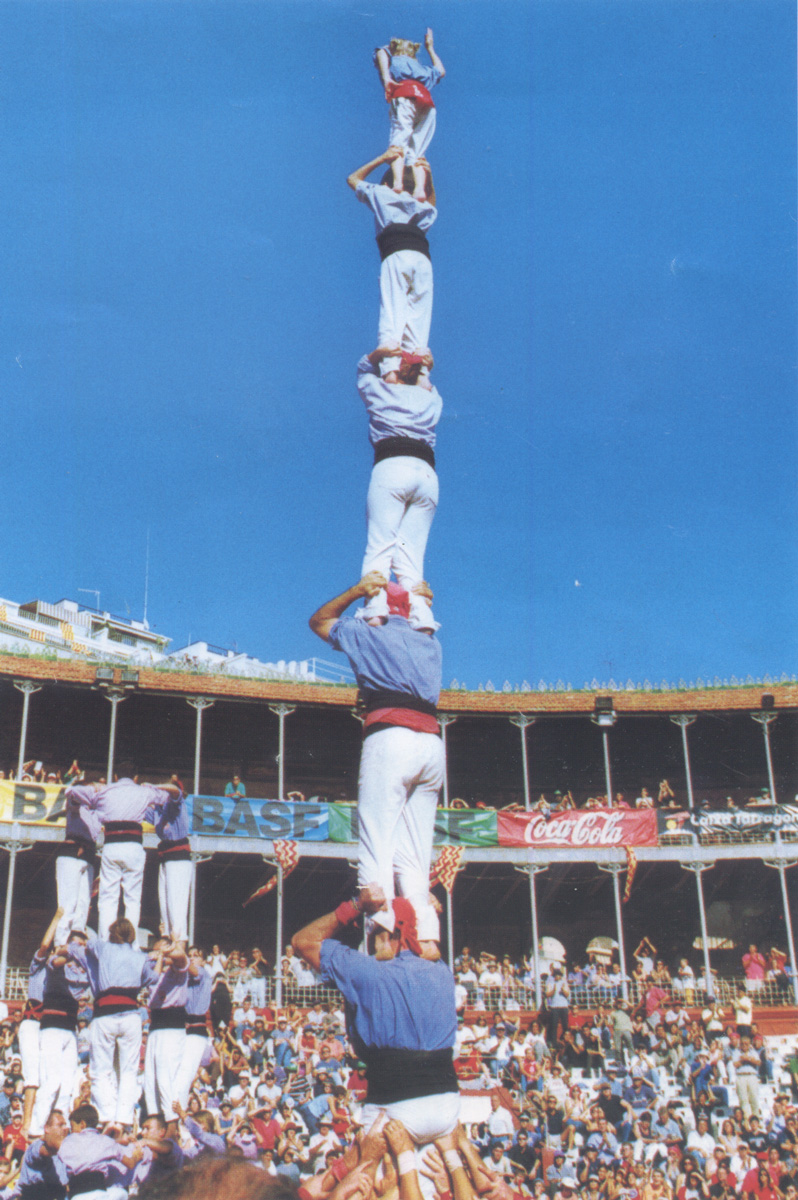
Pillar of 6 (c),6 Oct 02

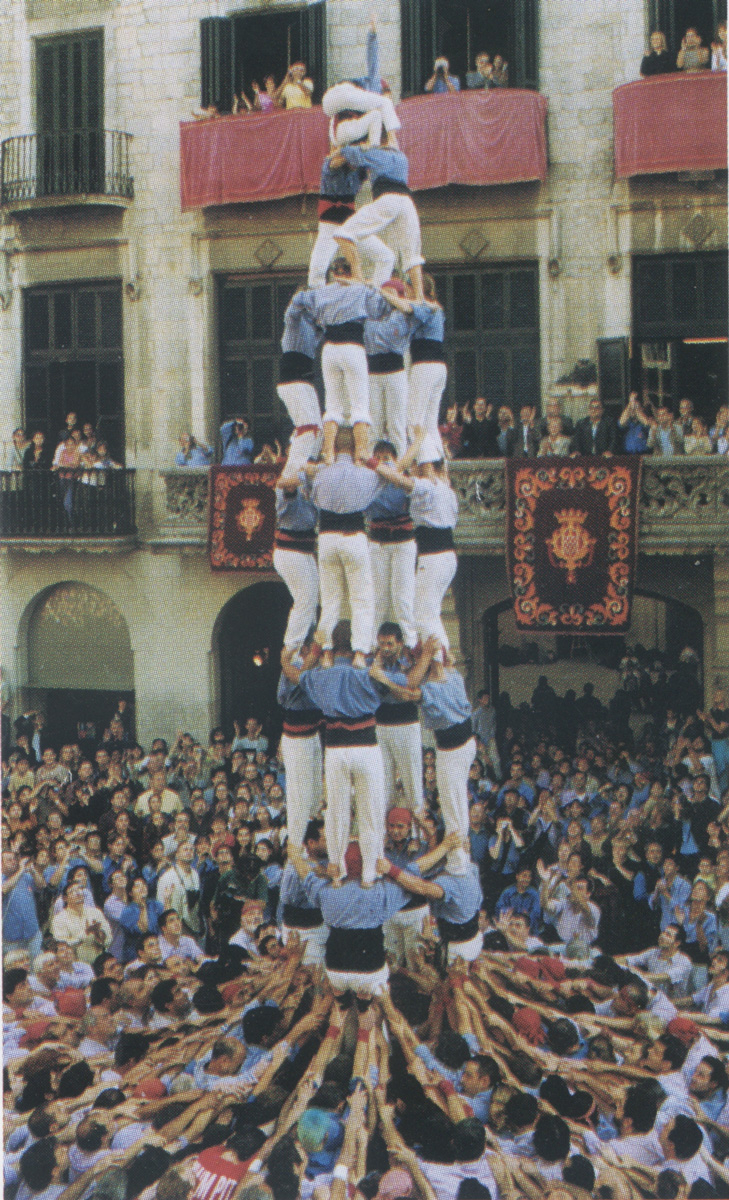
4 in 8, 28 Oct 01

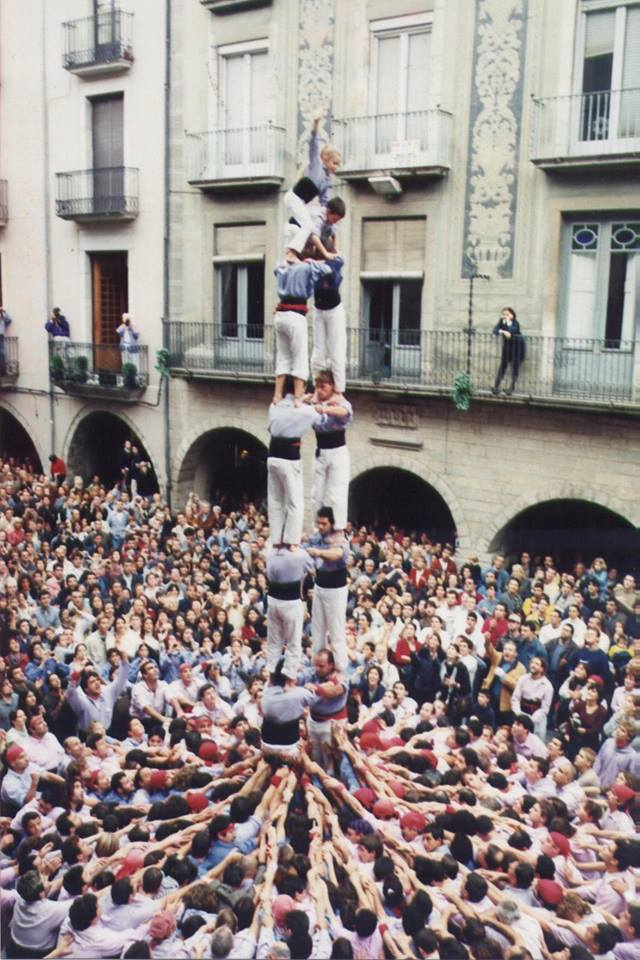
2 in 7, 24 Oct 99

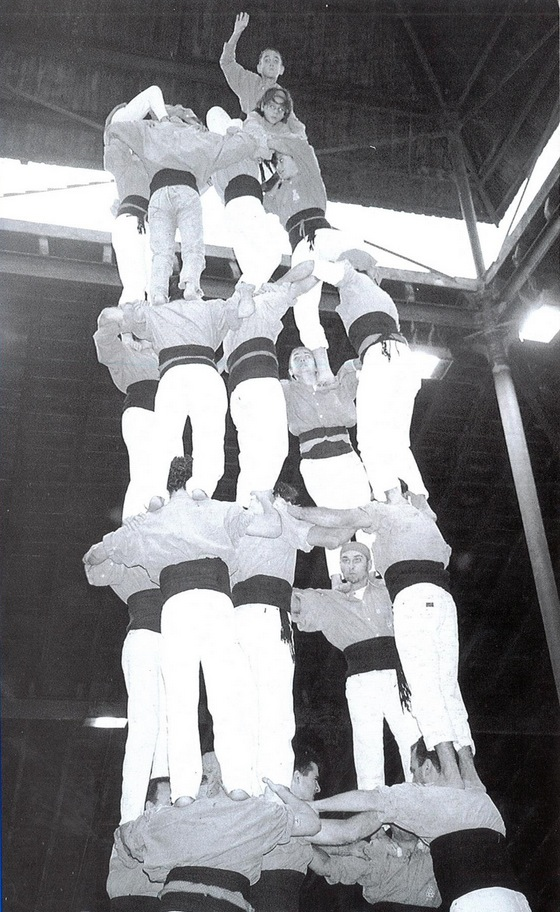
5 in 7, 29 Jun 97

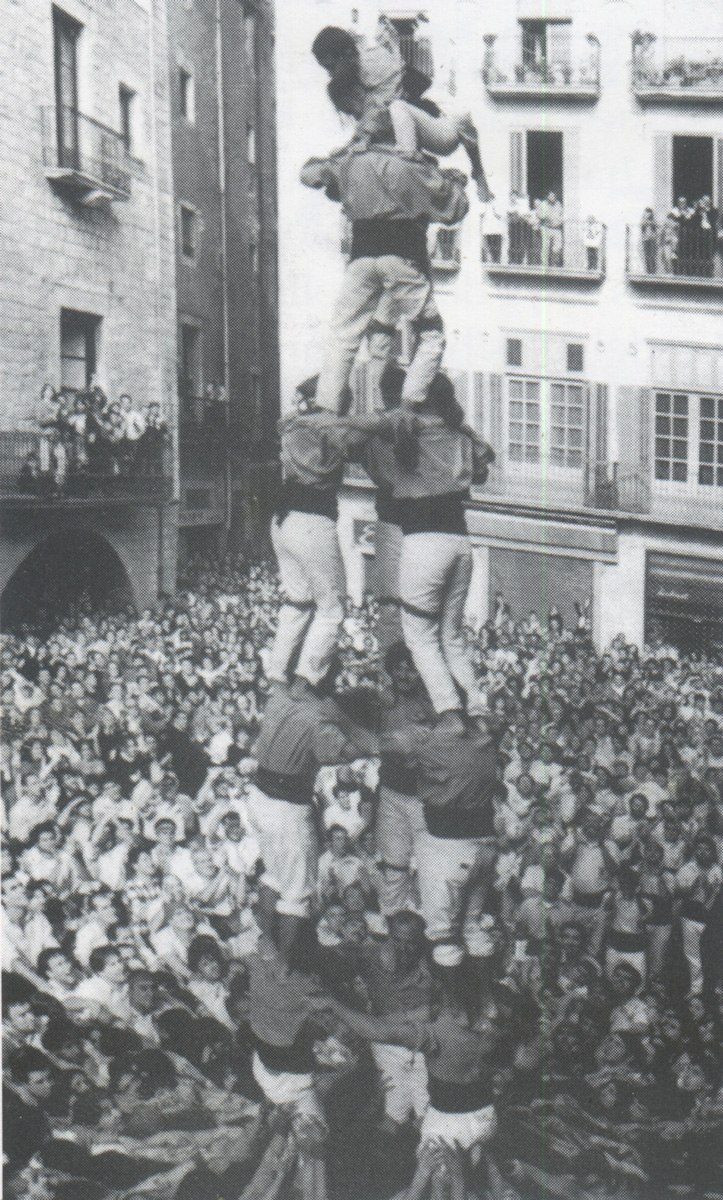
3 in 7, 27 Oct 96

By 2014, Marrecs had completed 2783 towers and they had crowned 71. The following table displays all the towers that Marrecs have built each season, taken from the database of the Coordinadora de Colles Castelleres de Catalunya.

	p4	4d6	3d6	3d6a	4d6a	5d6	3d6ps	2d6	9d6	p5	p5ps	4d7	3d7	3d7a	4d7a	5d7	7d7	3d7ps	9d7	2d7	4d8	p6	3d8	2d8f	5d8	
1996	125 (2)	14	23		29	9	6	17 (1)		3 (2)		4	3		(1)											233 (6)
1997	77	3	6 (1)		13	11	2	12	1	8 (1)		8	12		2 (3)	4										159 (5)
1998	116	8	12		14 (1)	9	4	18		13 (3)	3	14	13		7	5 (1)		2								238 (5)
1999	60	4	9		11	3	1	18		12 (3)	(1)	11	15 (1)		8 (2)	7				1						160 (7)
2000	41	8	14		6	3	2	14		13 (1)		9	9		4	1 (1)		2								126 (2)
2001	47	5	5		5		1	4		22 (1)		11	18		7	11		2		2 (2)	1		(1)			141 (4)
2002	45	1	1		3	1				26		11	18		19	6				9 (2)	3 (2)	(1)				143 (5)
2003	35 (1)	3	7		9	1	2	6		15 (1)		11	14		6	1					2					112 (2)
2004	26 (1)	3	4		3		2	1	1	15	9	10	12		11	5 (1)		10		2						114 (2)
2005	35 (1)	1	6		3	3	3	6		8 (1)	15	16	15 (1)		8	(2)		3		4 (2)						126 (7)
2006	45 (2)	2	6		5	2		2		9	11	11	11		7	7		4		7	3 (1)		1			133 (3)
2007	49		3		3	7		2		6	19	8	13		17	11				14	1		1			154
2008	41					1				5	10	7	5		9	16		9		8	(1)					111 (1)
2009	24 (2)	1	2		1	1				12	6	9	6	1	8	6		4		4 (1)	(1)					85 (4)
2010	33 (1)	3	3		5	1		1		22 (1)		13	11	5	9	8		6		2 (1)						122 (3)
2011	66 (1)	1			2	4		2		25		17	12		10	16				6	3					164 (1)
2012	70	2	2		3	2				18 (1)		11	11 (1)		4	12	1			9 (1)	4 (1)		2	(1)		151 (5)
2013	76 (2)	1	2	1	3	1		1		21		7	7			13	6			11 (1)	9	1 (1)	4	3		167 (4)
2014	55 (1)	2				3		1		23		10	7			12	4		1	12	5		8 (1)	1 (2)	(1)	144 (5)
	p4	4d6	3d6	3d6a	4d6a	5d6	3d6ps	2d6	9d6	p5	p5ps	4d7	3d7	3d7a	4d7a	5d7	7d7	3d7ps	9d7	2d7	4d8	p6	3d8	2d8f	5d8	
Total	1066 (14)	62	105 (1)	1	118 (1)	62	23	105 (1)	2	276 (15)	73 (1)	198	212 (3)	6	136 (6)	141 (5)	11	42	1	93 (10)	29 (6)	1 (2)	16 (2)	4 (3)	(1)	2783 (71)

- Brackets display towers that were only crowned.
- The figure for pillars of 4 include walking and raised pillars.
- Towers without the base are not included.
- Green = completed; red = crowned; yellow = tower previously done but not repeated

== Management ==
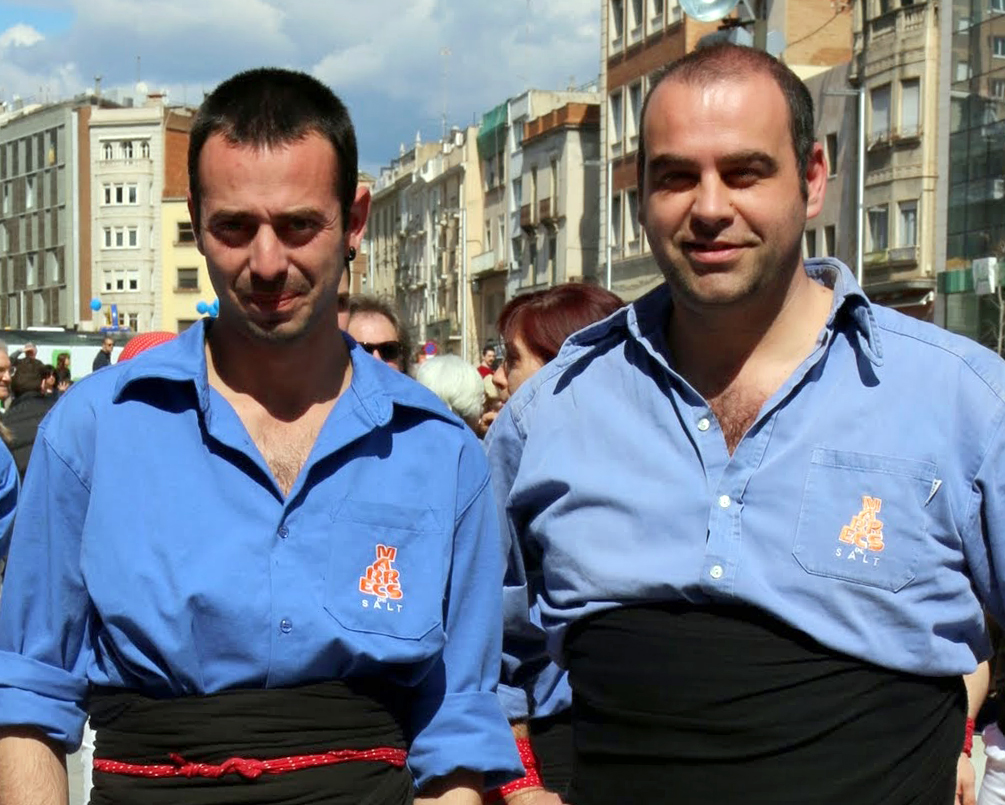
Aram Martí (left) and Sebastià Morató (right)

The group is managed by two boards: the presidential board and the technical board. The current technical board has Aram Martí as the group leader, with four teams, for the trunk, the base, the extra base and the children. The presidential board has Sebastià Morató as the president, with vicepresident, secretary, treasurer and representatives for the musicians, communication, children, health and safety and welcoming committee.

Group leaders:

- Aram Martí (since 2015)
- Sergi Camps (2011-2014)
- Ferran de Batlle (2009-2010)
- Baltasar Bosch (2004-2008)
- Àlex Massaguer (2003)
- Ramon Grau (2003)
- Xavier Pinsach (2001-2002)
- Àngel Pararols (2000)
- Pep Vila (1999-2000)
- Jordi Domingo (1995-1998)

Presidents:

- Sebastià Morató (since 2015)
- Josep Masdevall (2011-2014)
- Rosa Ma. Pérez (2010)
- Josep Masdevall (2006-2009)
- Josep Ferrer (2004-2005)
- Pere Massaguer (2000-2003)
- Jaume Prujà (1998-1999)
- Ramon Grau (1995-1997)

== Awards ==
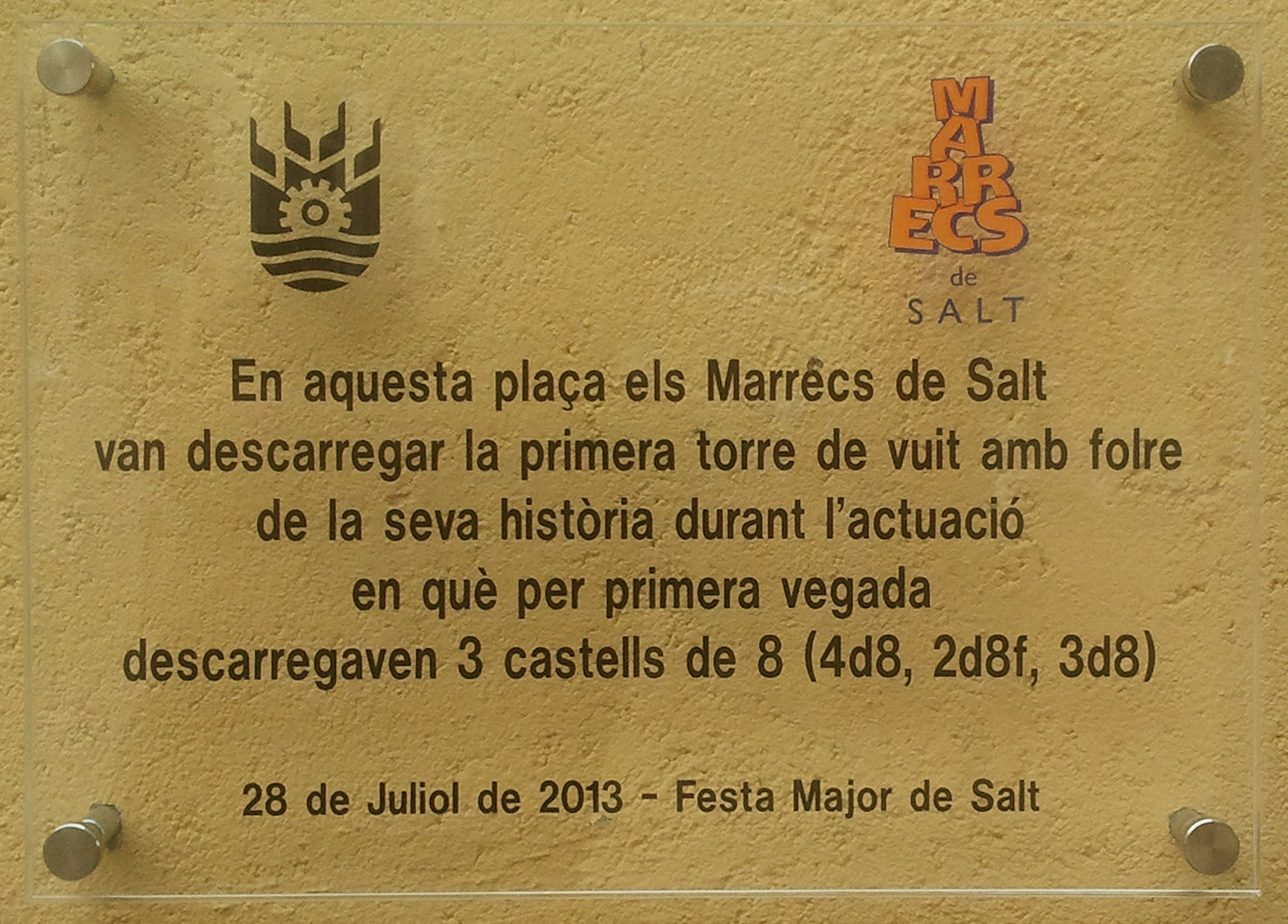
Commemorative plate in Salt

In 1998 the city council of Salt awarded them with the 3 de març award for being a remarkable institution working for the village. In 2003, Ateneu d'Acció Cultural awarded them with the normalització lingüística award. In 2009 they were awarded as Gironí de l'any. In 2010 Federació d'Ateneus de Catalunya gave them the Ateneus award for their social and cultural activities, thanks to the project of integration of the Senegal immigrants in Salt, mixing traditional activities of the Catalan people with music form the Senegalese association of musicians Oudiodial.

In 2002, the city council of Girona placed a plate in Plaça del Vi to commemorate the 4 in 8 and the crowned 3 in 8 of the performance of Sant Narcís the previous. In 2002, the city council of Salt placed a plate in Lluís Companys square to commemorate the first tower of eight level ever completed in the village. On 27 April 2014, matching the performance of the 18 years of the group, the city council of Salt, added another plate to commemorate the first performance of Marrecs with three completed towers of eight levels, which happened 28 July 2013.

In 2016 the Girona council chooses the Marrecs de Salt as the toastmasters of the local fest. Marrecs were also responsible for commemorating the 600th anniversary of the Gothic nave of the Cathedral of Girona; on 1 November, after the traditional climbing of the stairs with a pillar of 4, the colla castellera raised a 3 in 8 and a pillar of 6 in the Gothic nave of the cathedral.
