= Correfoc =

Fire-centric feature of Catalan festivals

Video of correfoc in Girona

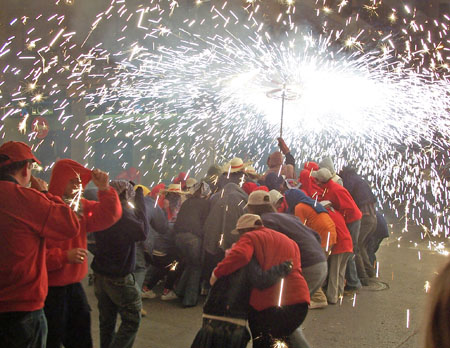
Correfoc in Valencia

Correfocs (Catalan pronunciation: [ˌkorəˈfɔks]); literally in English "fire-runs") are an element of many Valencian and Catalan festivals in which a group of individuals will dress as devils and light fireworks fixed on devil's pitchforks or strung above the route. Some groups have beasts like dragons or giants. The spectators that participate dress with hats and handkerchiefs to protect themselves against burns or smoke as attempt to get as close as possible to the devils, running with the fire. Other spectators will watch from "safe" distances, rapidly retreating as necessary. A correfoc is different from a parade or a procession. The correfoc is faster and can be very intense, and the parade is slower and usually without participation of the people.

The correfoc can come in many forms. Some are simple parades using fireworks and effigies of the devil. In other ones, like in Sitges, it is common for the crowd to run through narrow streets or squares filled with fireworks. Correfocs are usually run during Catalan local festivals, like La Mercè in Barcelona, the Santa Tecla Festival in Tarragona and the Performance of Saint Narcís in Girona.

== Music ==
Usually, correfocs have drum bands that follow the devils, but some of them, like in Manresa, incorporate music composed specifically for the occasion. The music is typically played by a band, while in some cases, pre-recorded audio files are played with speakers.

== Examples ==
Another typical Catalan folkloric expression of this sort takes place in L'Arboç. The highlight of the village's feast is the Carretillada. In the evening of the feast day, the town square is made to look like Hell. For nearly half an hour, "devils" burn their carretilles (carts), jumping around ceaselessly, while a large "sceptre of Lucifer" and the "pitchfork of the Diablessa (she-devil)" shoot fire-jets and other pyrotechnics. Every year, the carretillada is a bit different, because the "colla" does not give up novelties that are added each year to add to the spectacle.

== Gallery ==
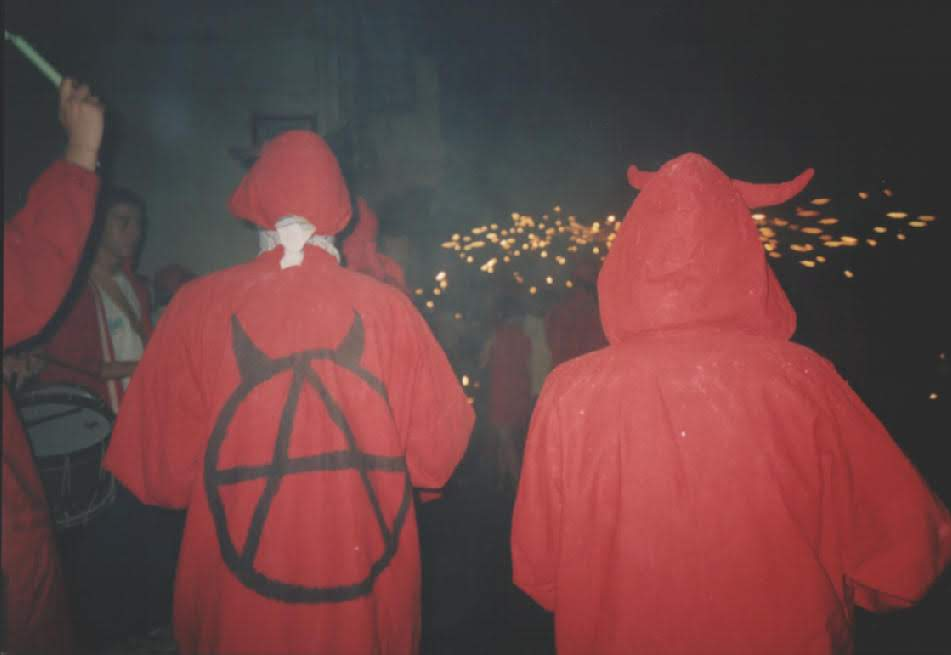
Correfoc in Benimaclet

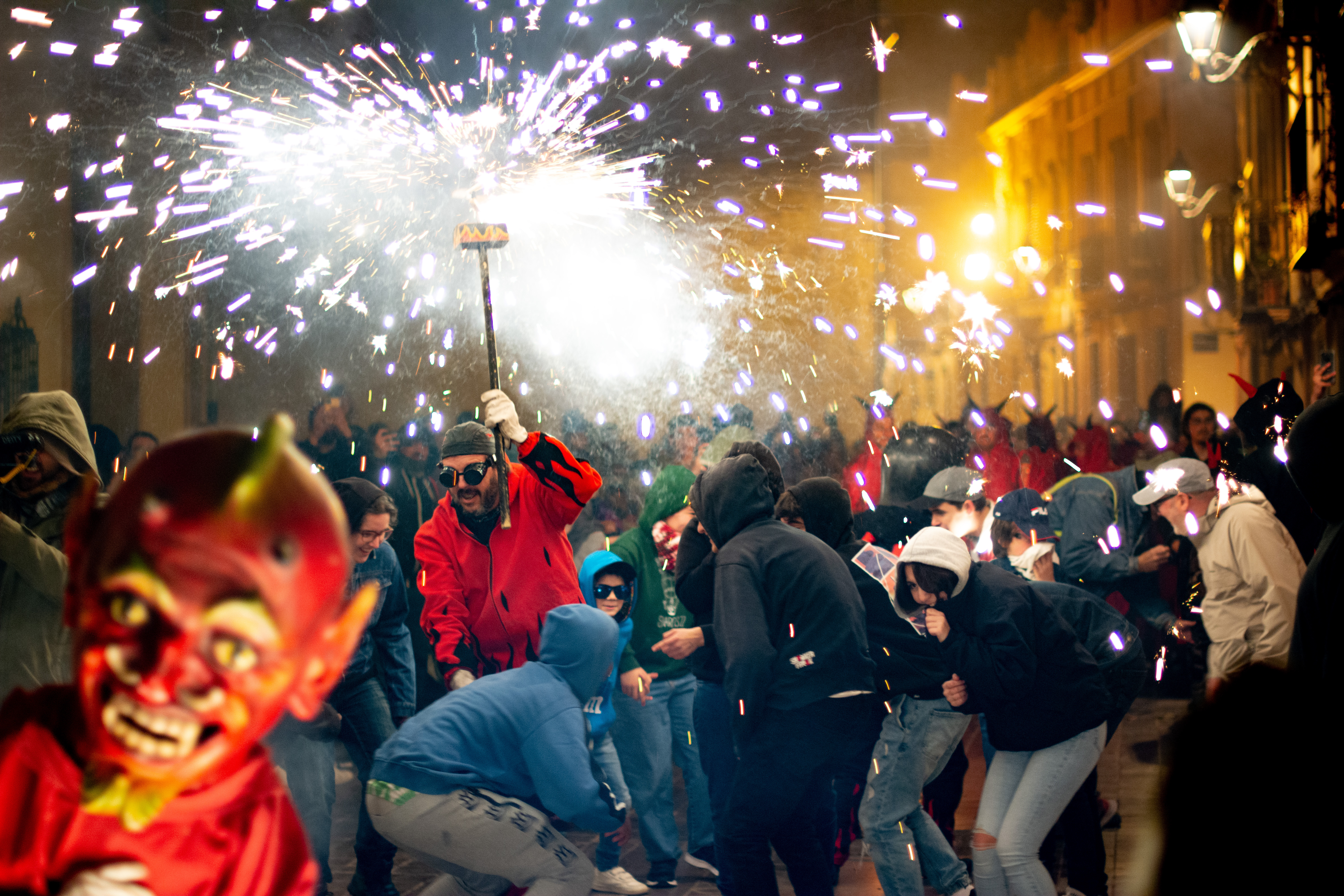
Devil raising the pitchfork above participants heads and devil's processional giant head.

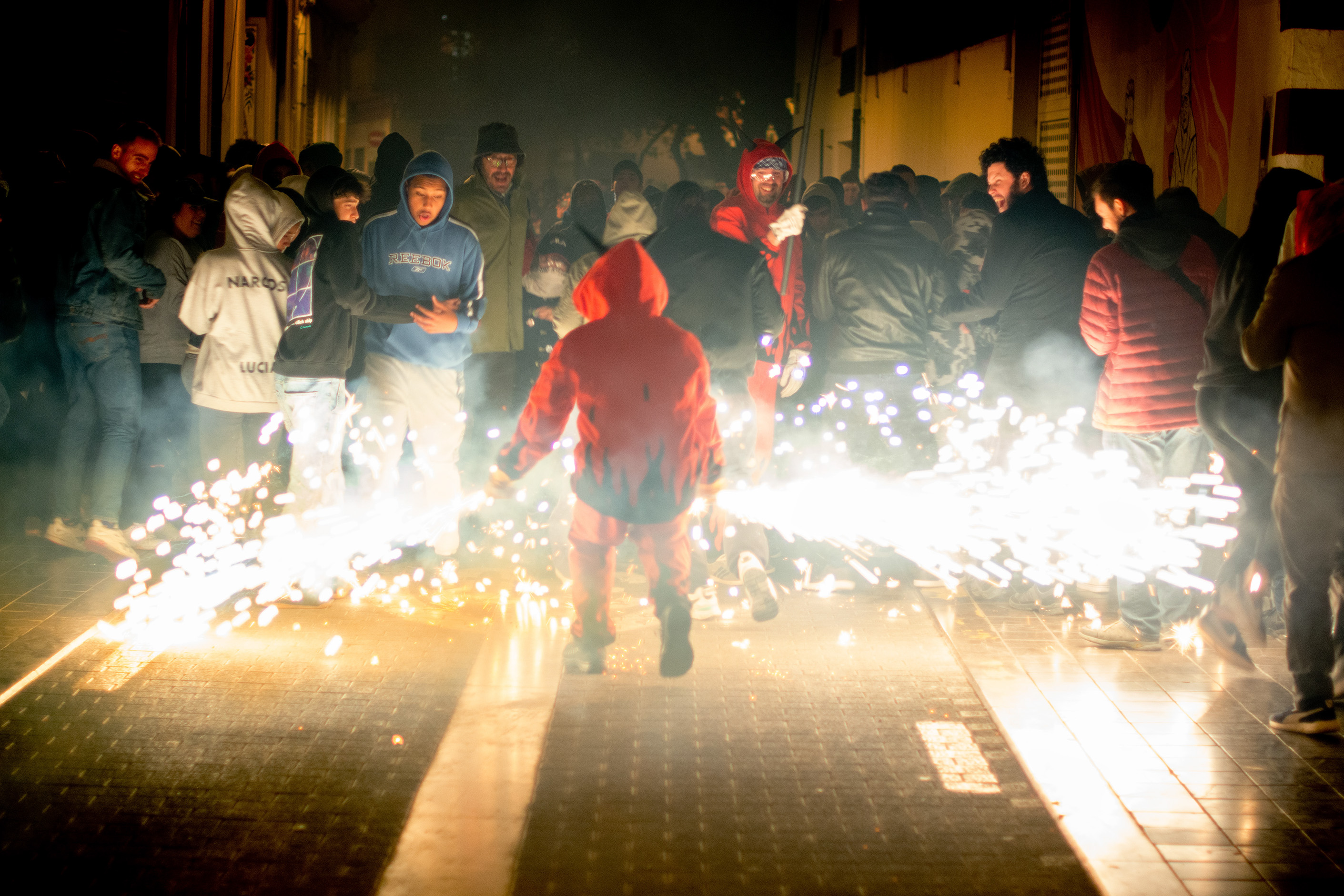
Devil pointing the pitchfork fireworks to the floor and running towards the crowd.

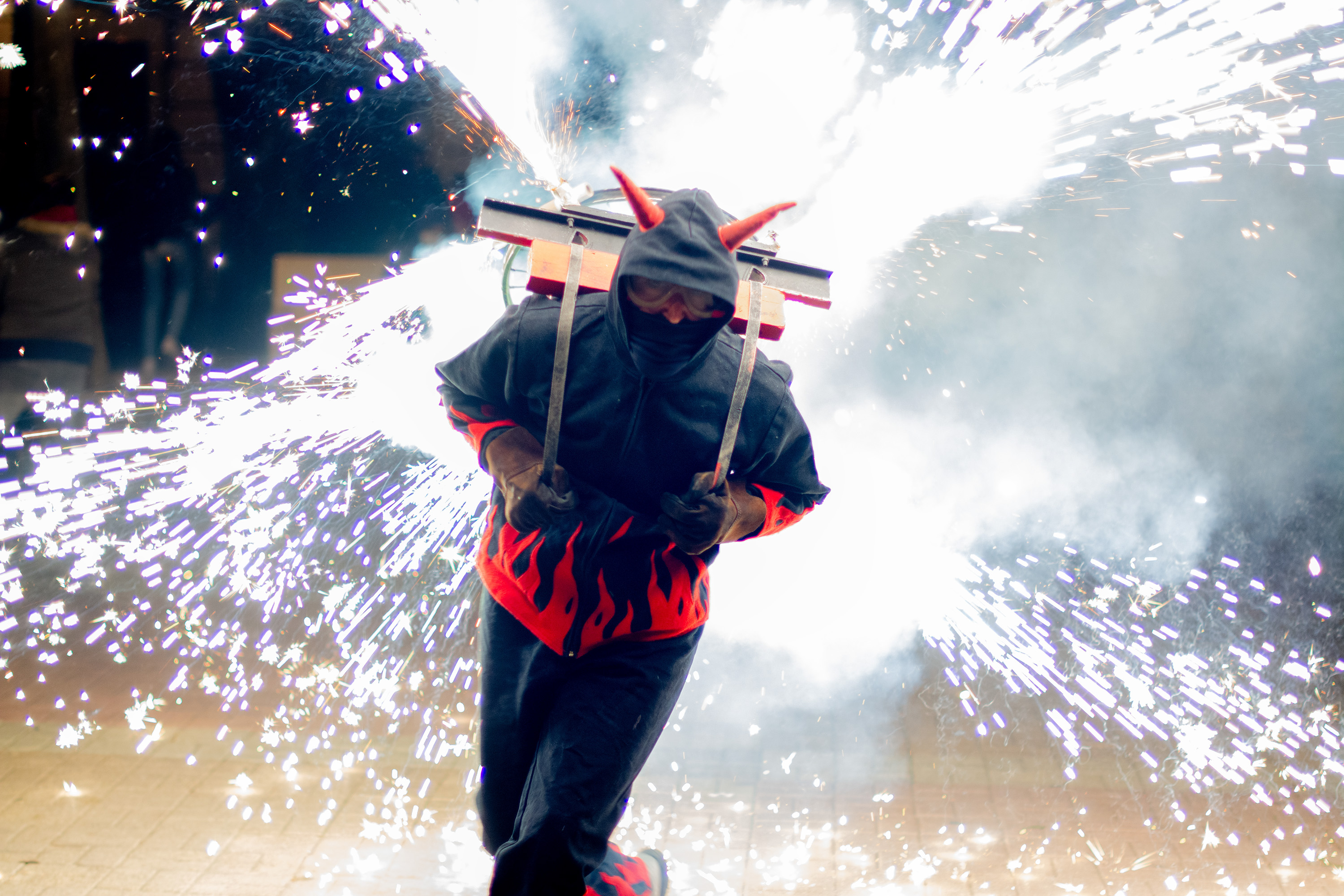
Devil using a backpack equipped with fireworks.

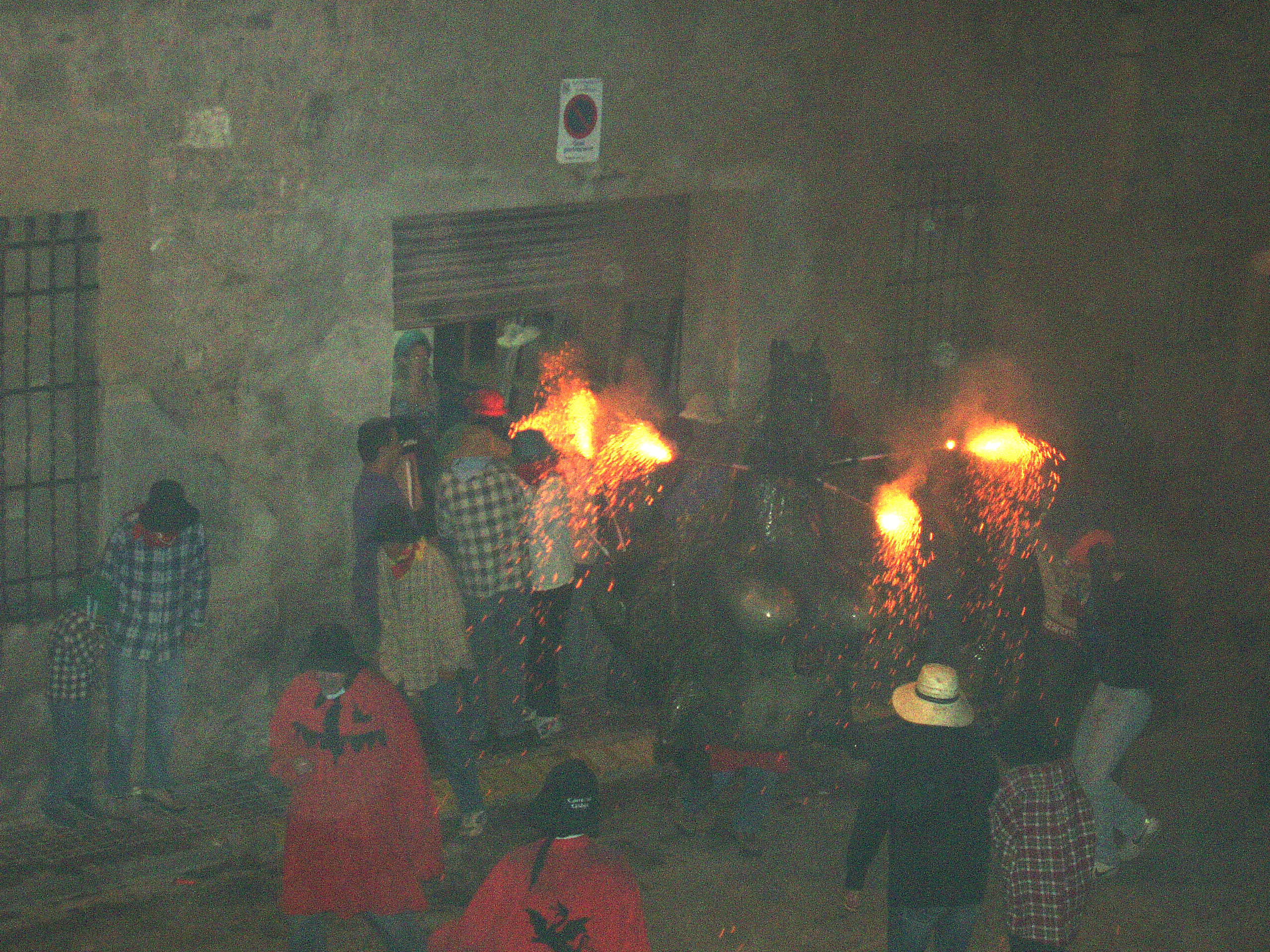
Víbria (Female dragon) in Manresa

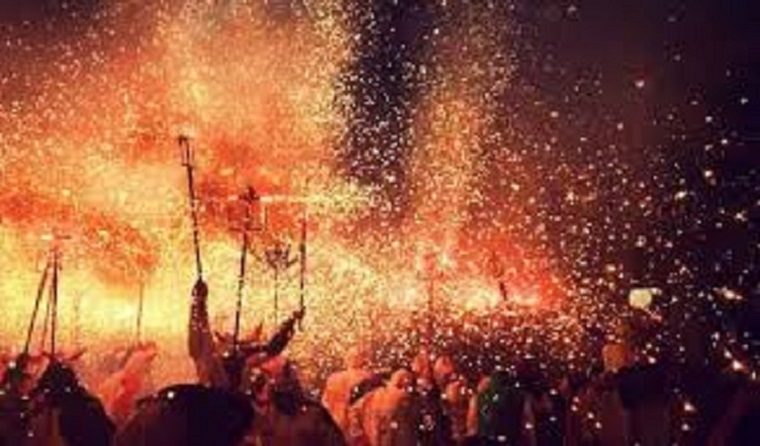
Correfoc in Sant Martí de Provençals

== See also ==
- Ball de diables
- Toro de fuego
- Processional giant
- Patum de Berga
