= 2 in 8 with double base =

Castellers human tower

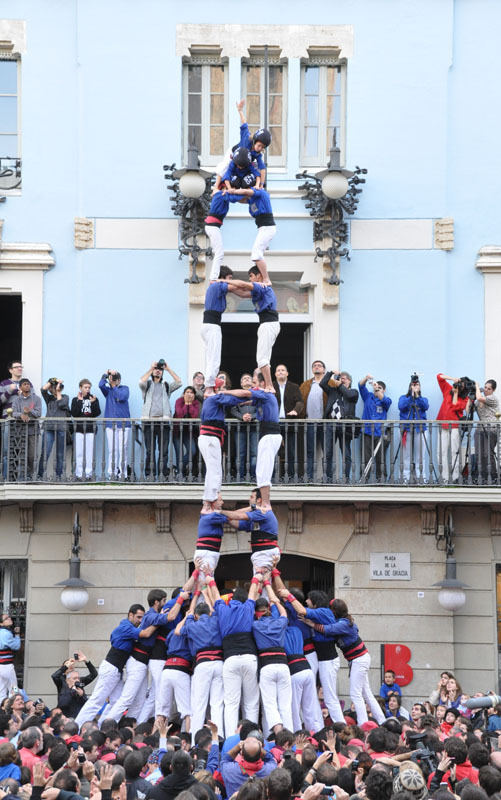
2 in 8 with double base by Castellers de la Vila de Gràcia

A 2 in 8 with double base (Catalan: 2 de 8 amb folre or torre de vuit amb folre) is a castellers human tower with 8 levels and 2 people per level in the trunk. It is strengthened by a second base (folre) in the second level, which helps the third level. The top crown consists of the pair (dosos), a bending child (acotxador) and the crowner (enxaneta). The last two members of the tower are the only ones that climb down through the opposite row they have used to climb up.

It is a very fragile human tower and it needs technical and equilibrated castellers to complete it. It is considered the third most difficult tower of 8 levels, after the 4 in 8 and the 3 in 8, and the first of the high range of 8, followed by the 7 in 8 and 5 in 8. Until 2014, 22 groups of castellers have attempted this tower and all of them have completed it.
