= Pillar of 6 =

Type of human tower

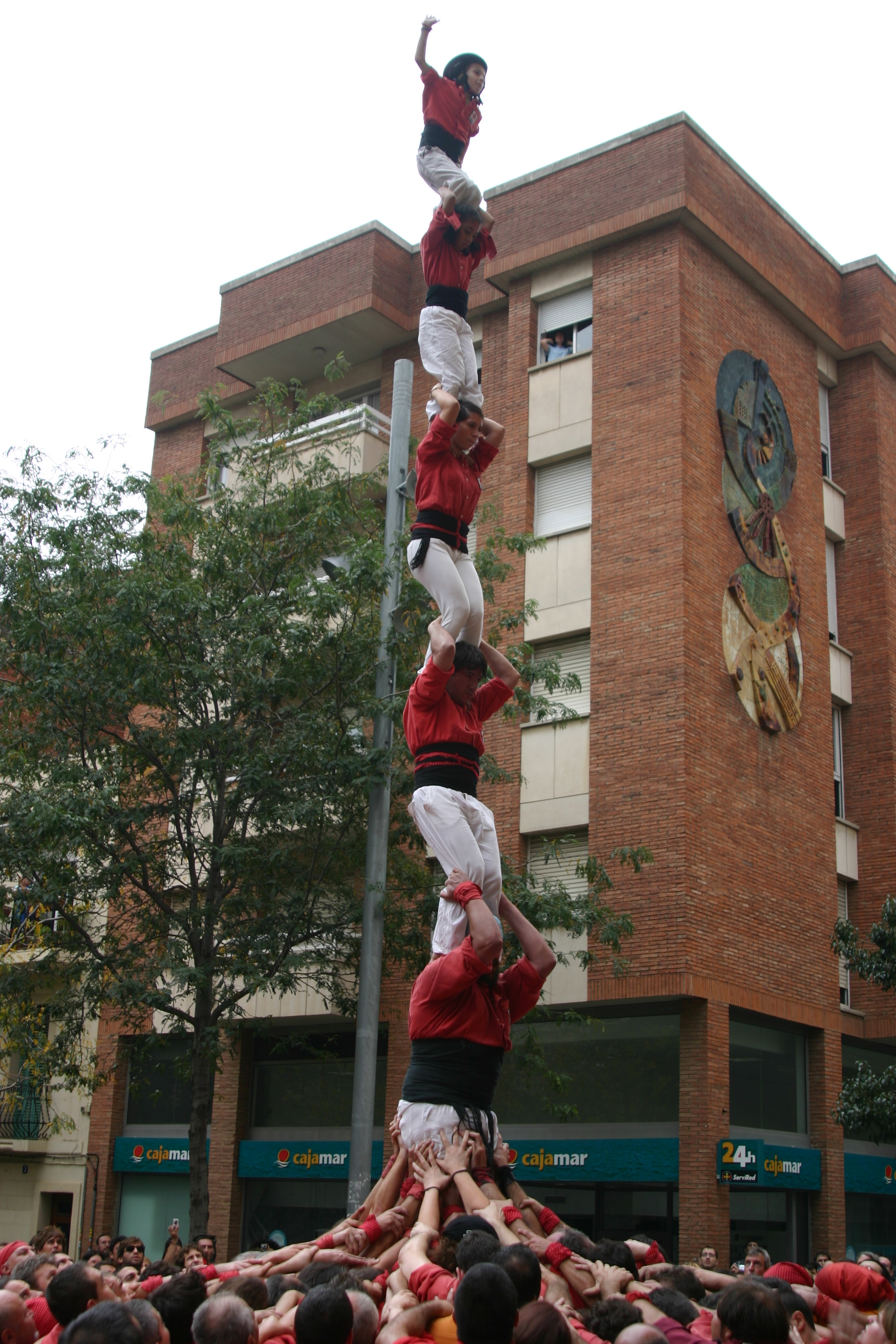
Pillar of 6 crowned by Castellers de Barcelona in 2008

The pillar of 6 (Catalan: pilar de 6) is a castellers human tower with six levels and one person per level. Its difficulty is comparable to the 3 in 8 and the 4 in 8 and most rankings give it a punctuation similar to them. This tower was seen in the 19th century, and the last one completed before the decay of the castellers before its blooming in the 20th century was in Vilanova i la Geltrú in 1890.
