= Performance of Sant Narcís =

Coordinates: 41°58′58″N 02°49′28″E

The Performance of Sant Narcís (or Diada de Sant Narcís in Catalan) is an annual performance of human towers made by castellers in Plaça del Vi, Girona. It is part of the acts of the main festivities of the city of Girona, dedicated to Saint Narcissus, patron of the city. Sant Narcís has seen som milestones by Minyons de Terrassa which in 1998 completed the first 4 in 9 with single base of the 20th century and their first pillar of 7 with double base, in 2008 their first pillar of 8 with triple base and in 2014 the 3 in 10 with triple base.

== Gallery ==
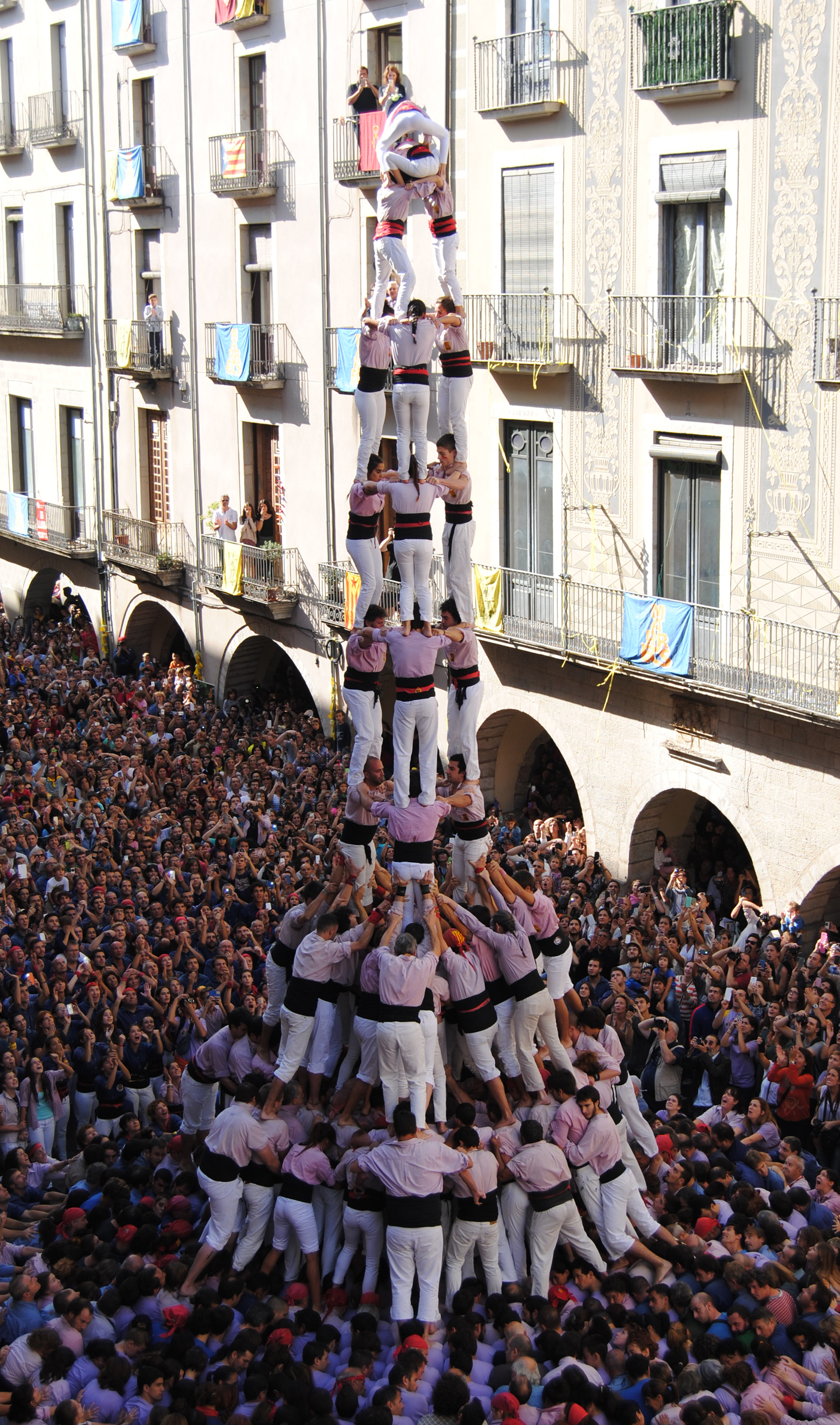
3 in 10 with triple base by Minyons de Terrassa, 2014

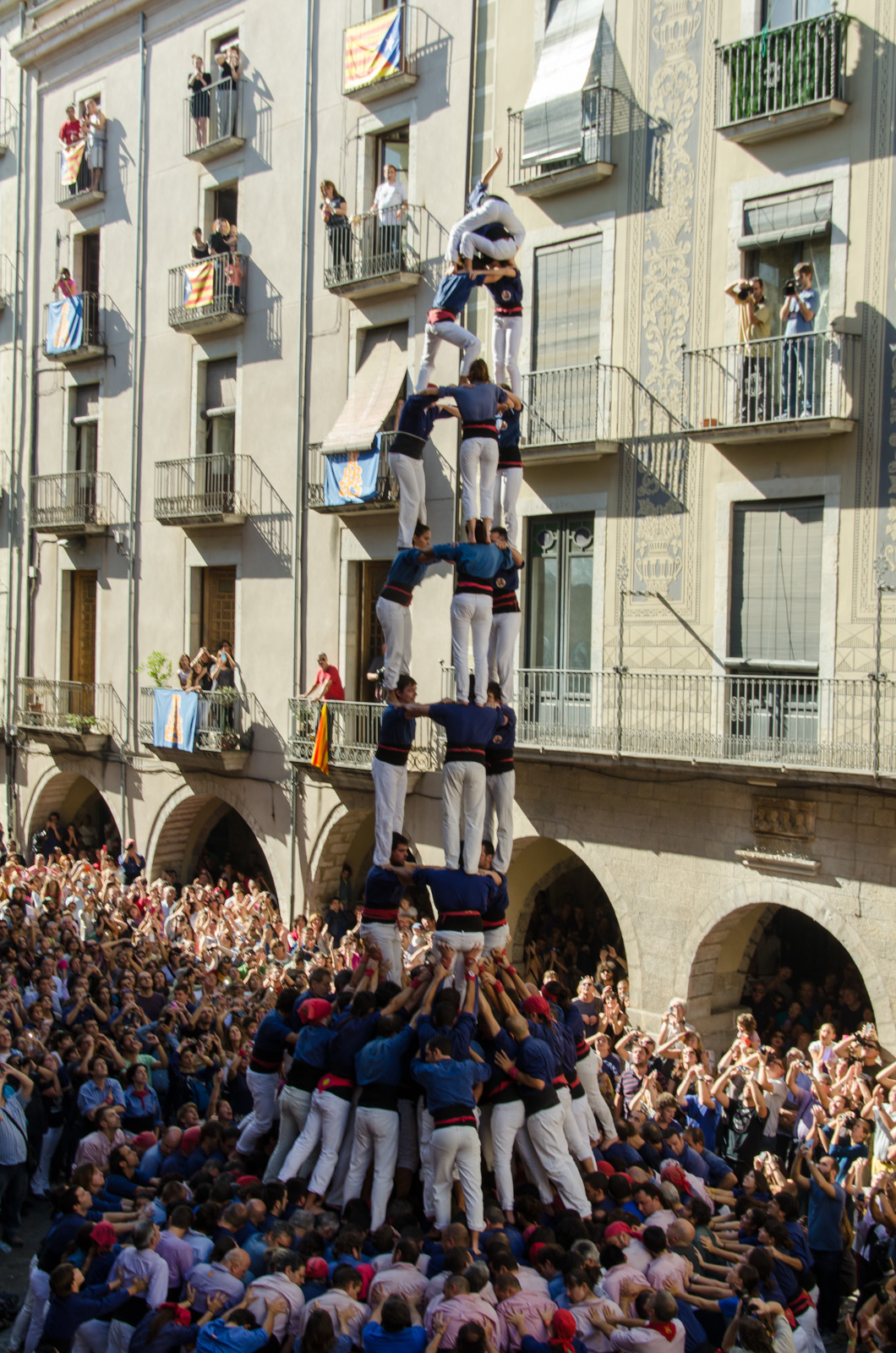
3 in 9 with double base by Capgrossos de Mataró, 2013

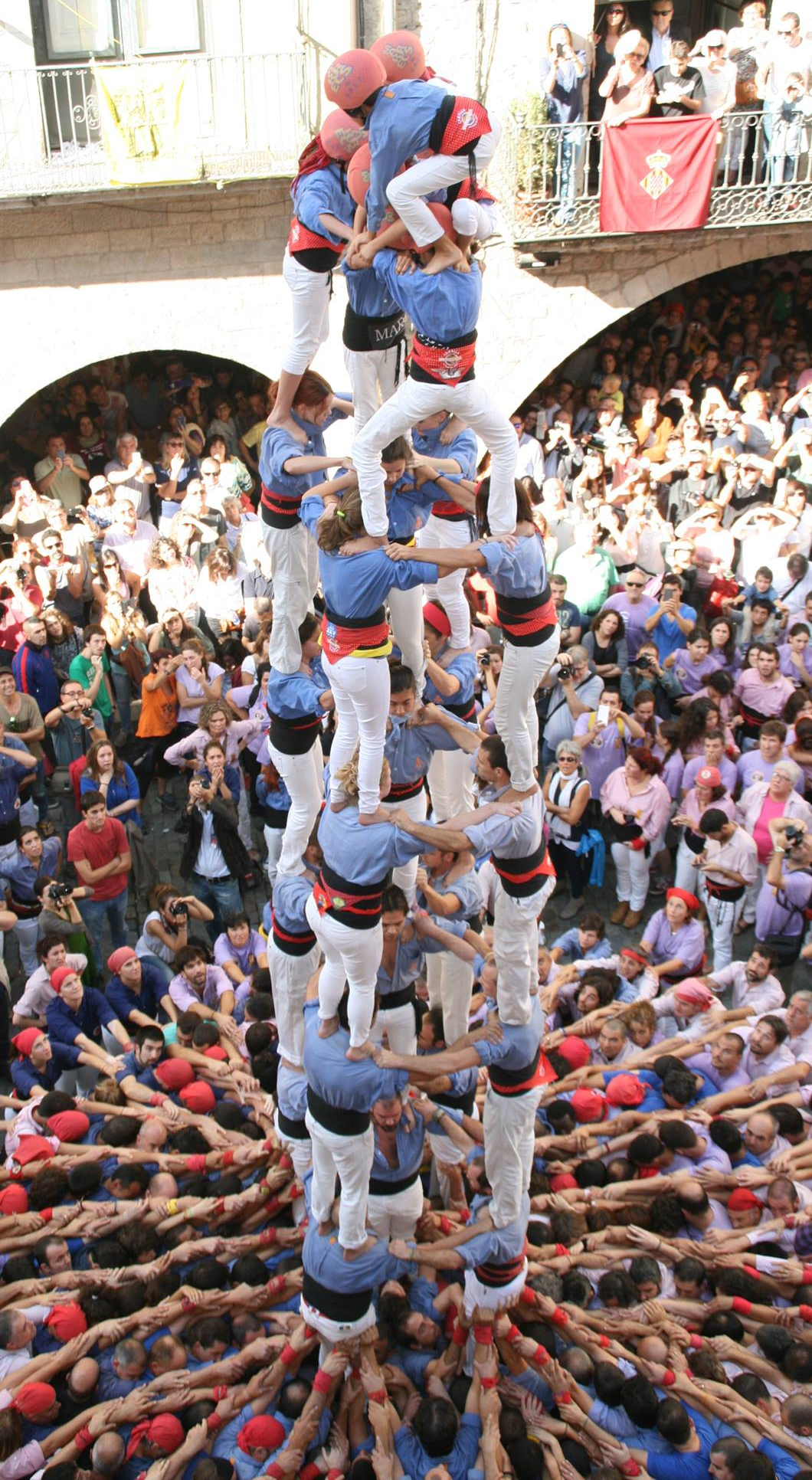
5 in 8 crowned by Marrecs de Salt, 2014

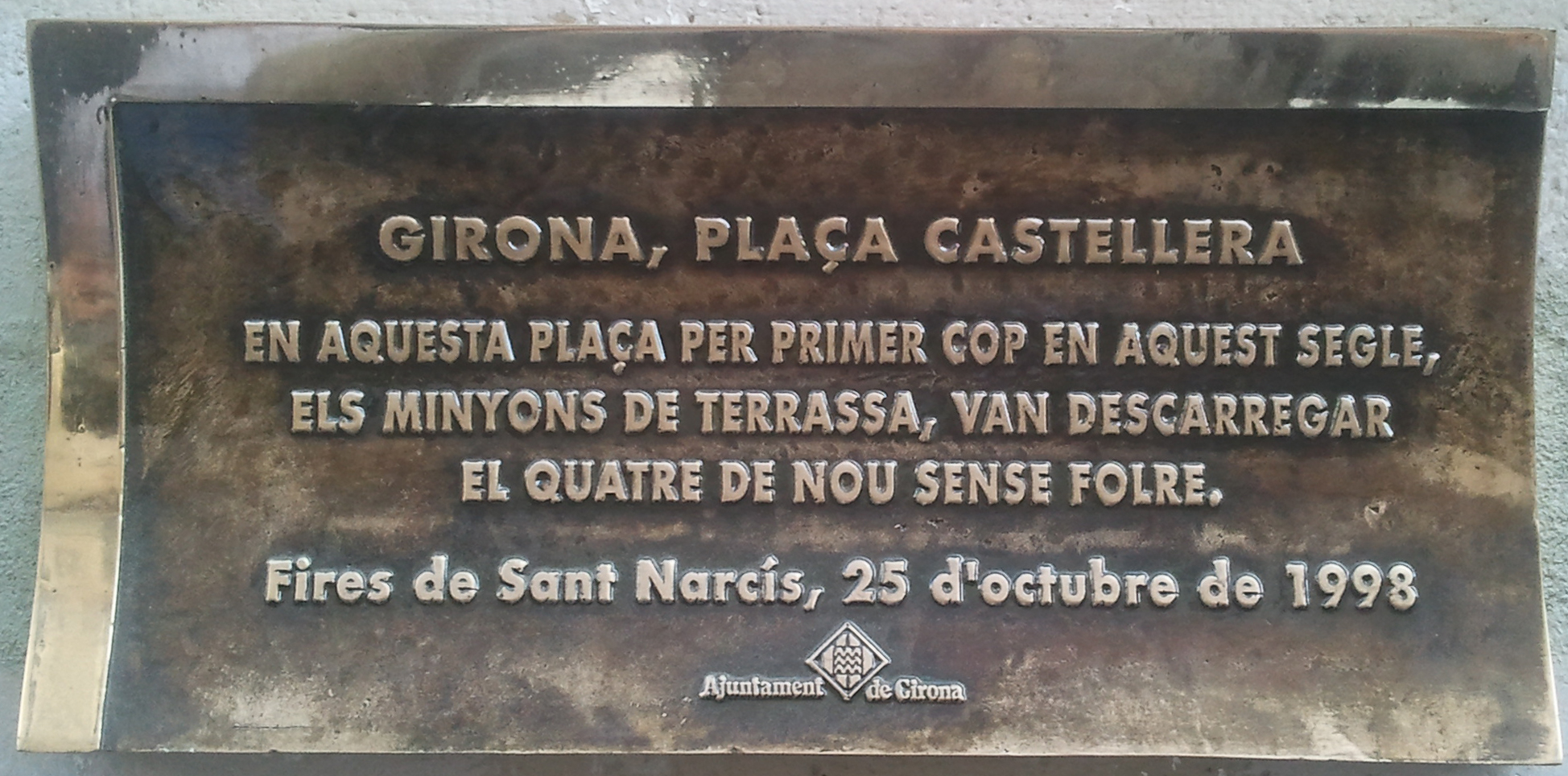
Plate dedicated to Minyons de Terrassa

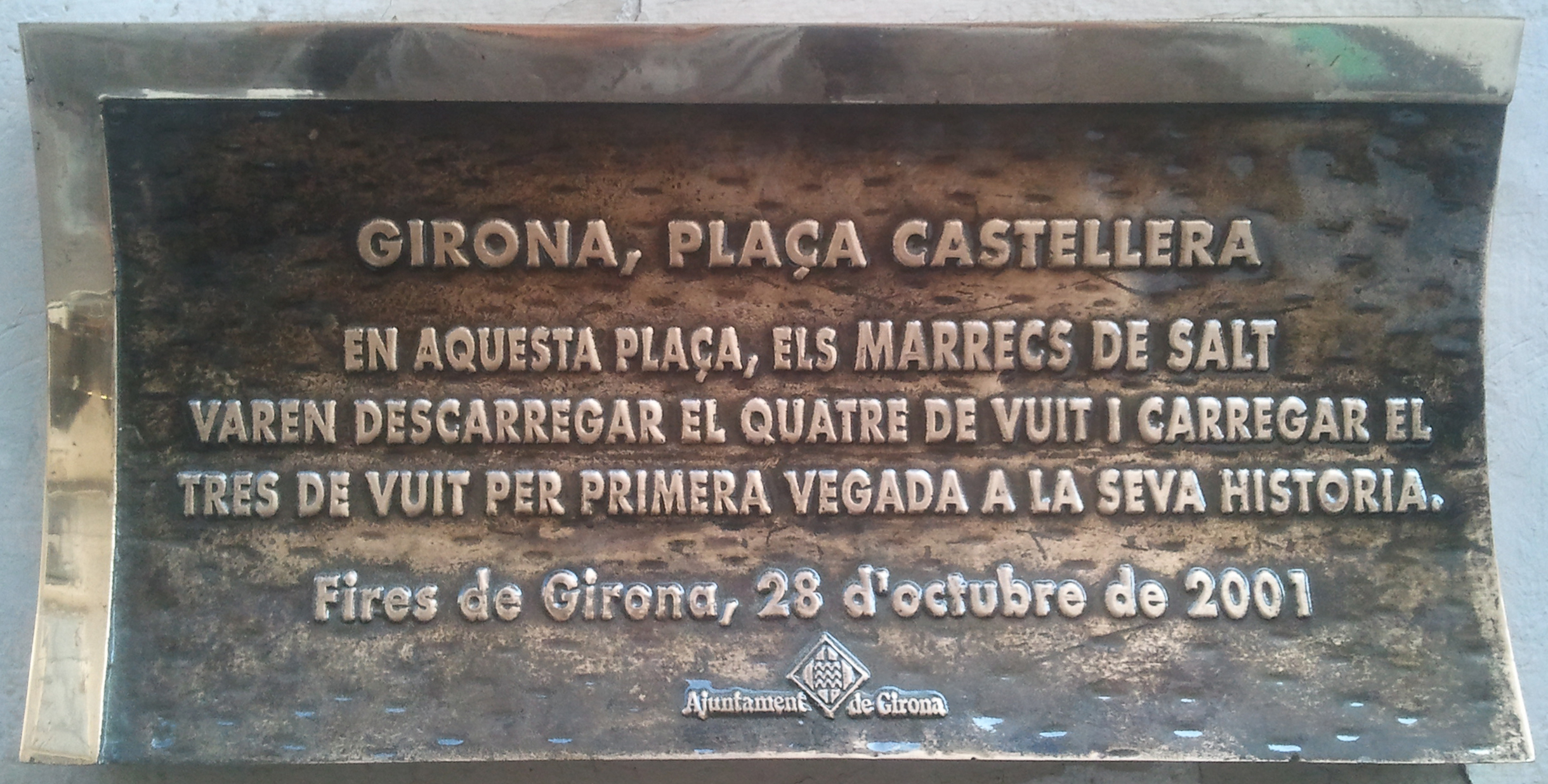
Plate dedicated to Marrecs de Salt
