= Ball de diables =

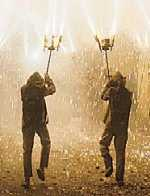
Devils in a performance

The ball de diables (Catalan pronunciation: [ˈbaʎ də ðiˈabːləs]; Catalan for "Devils' dance") is a dance tradition originating from Catalonia, though it is also observed in the Valencian Community and the Balearic Islands. Over the course of centuries, the balls de diables have evolved into the modern day correfocs (fire runs). Participation in the form of passacaglia (processions) and correfocs is an essential part of celebrations in many towns and cities.

== History ==
The origin of the ball de diables is uncertain, but they are believed to have come from medieval street theater, passed down through the oral tradition, evolving in the process.

Though the ball de diables is popularly known as a dance, it is more appropriately an entremés since the performance was presented in between the entrees of the nobility in the Middle Ages.

The theme of ball de diables is a theatrical representation of the struggle between the good and the evil. In its scenic context, it has been used mainly for Corpus Christi festivities, in ecclesiastic processions as accompaniment to provide a more ceremonious and spectacular aspect. The demons used to lead a procession to announce its arrival make a racket. They used loud noise to clear a path through the public for the procession.

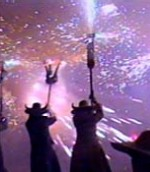
Demons in a ball de diables

The figure of the devil or little devil is in all the spoken dances. It has no relationship with the play represented, but makes the audience laugh with its stunts. At the end of the play satiric verses are recited that are related to the political or public life of the local area and that everyone awaits with delight.

This could have been the origin of the ball de diables. Starting from a character that each time was taking more prominence and exceeding the importance of the original play, and as a result the devil part became the most popular one.

The first written account of a ball de diables, according to Joan Amades, was in 1150. The act was represented at the banquet of the wedding of the Barcelona count, Ramon Berenguer IV with the princess Petronilla, daughter of the king of Aragon and Catalonia. The chronicle tells us that it represented the struggle of some demons, commanded by Lucifer, against the Archangel Saint Michael and a squad of angels.

The second written reference, quoted in the book of solemnities of Barcelona, is about the festivities of 1423 commemorating the arrival to Barcelona of King Alfonso V of Aragon from Naples.

Also in Cervera, the devils participate for the festivities of Corpus Christi in 1426. In Barcelona, on the occasion of the arrival of the duke of Calabria in September 1467, parties were organized and devils were present.

In the beginnings of the 15th century, the processions of Corpus Christi in Barcelona were closed with a short play, formed by one squad of angels and another of devils.
