= Benimaclet =

Former village of Valencia, Spain

Coordinates: 39.485°N 0.362°W

- District of Valencia
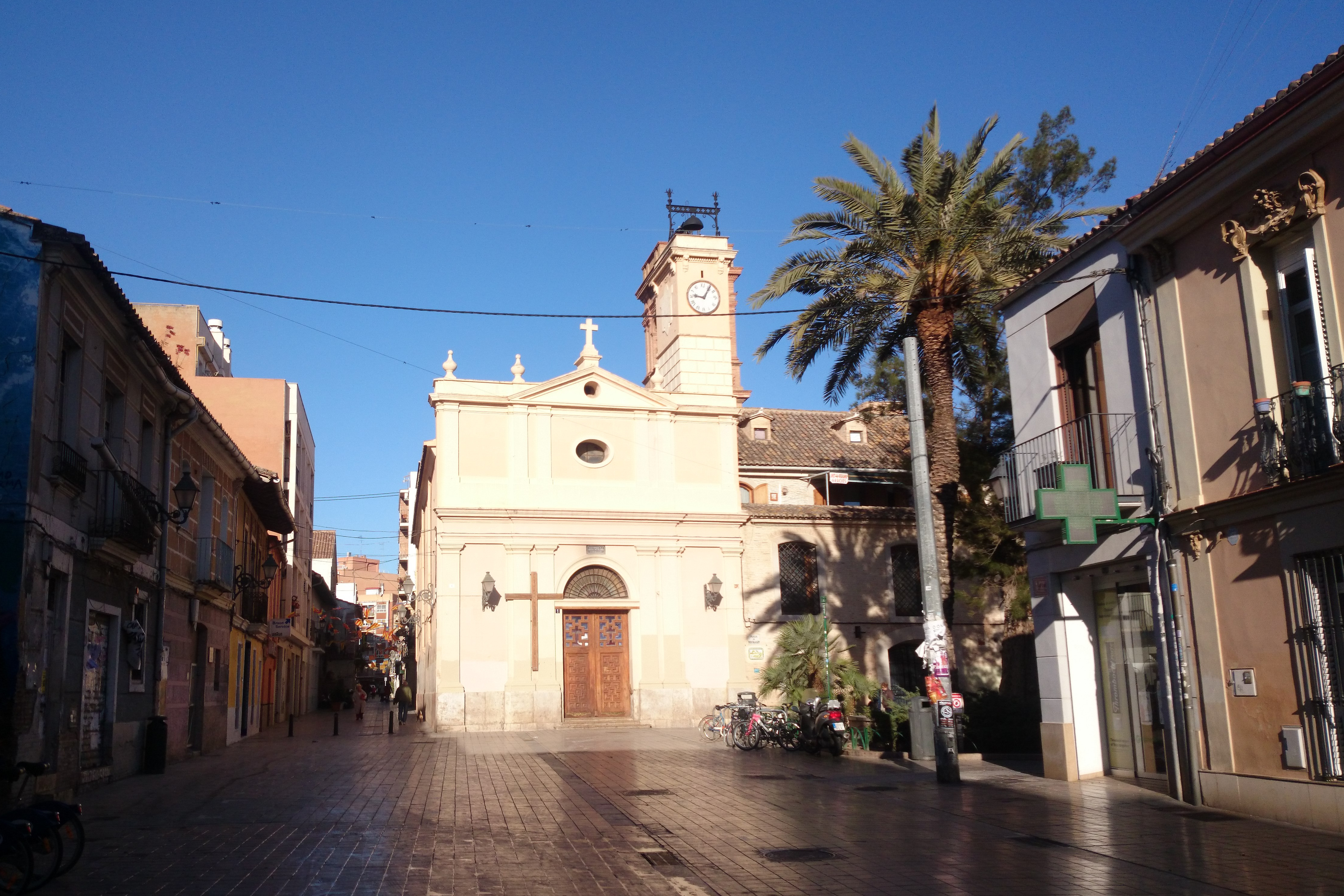
- Plaça de Benimaclet with Església de la Mare de Déu de l'Assumpció

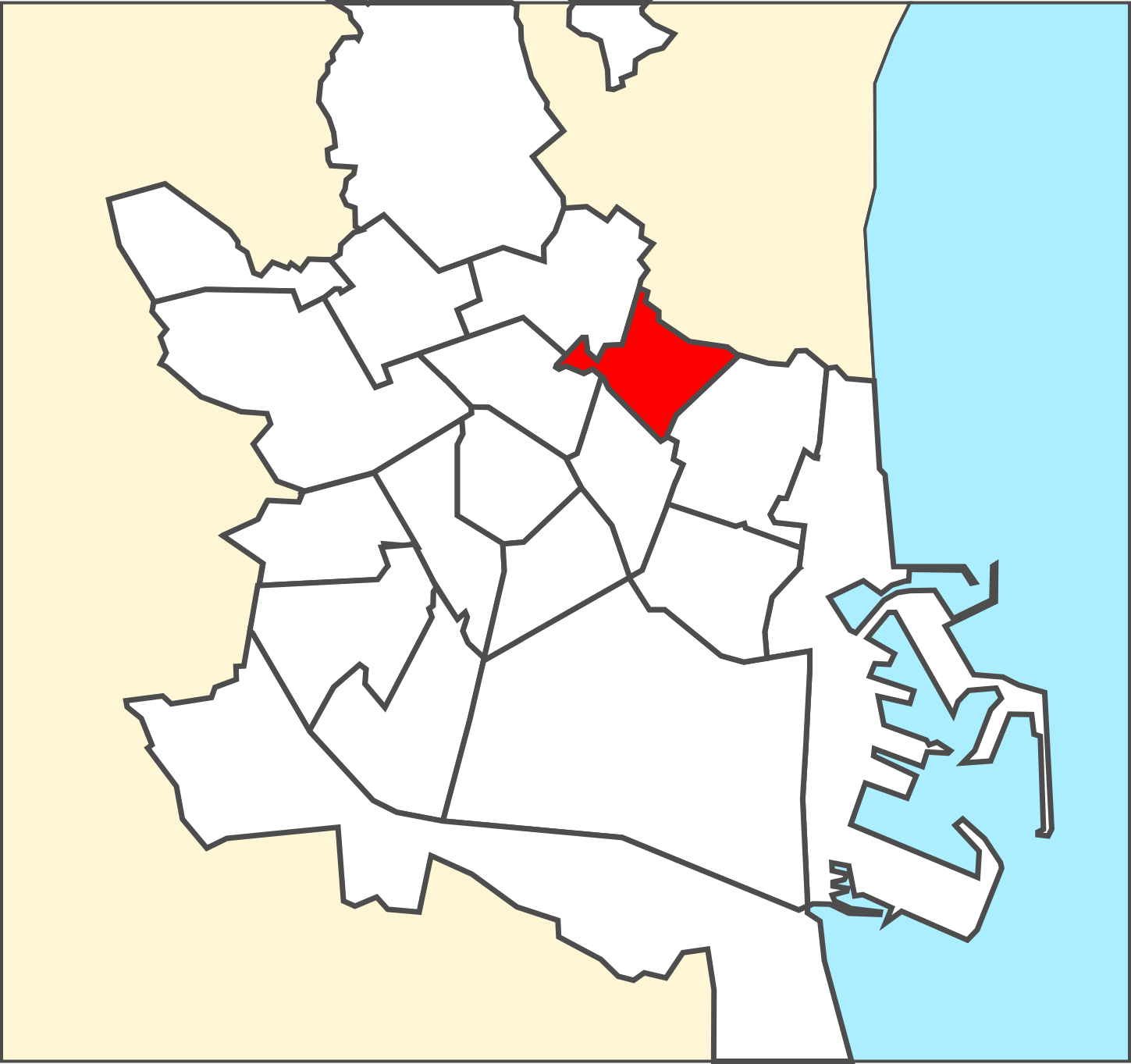
- Location of Benimaclet, in Valencia
- Country: Spain
- Autonomous community: Valencian Community
- Province: Valencia
- Comarca: Comarca de València
- Municipality: Valencia
- Neighbourhoods: List: Benimaclet; Camí de Vera

Area
  - Total: 1.57 km^{2} (0.61 sq mi)

Population (2024)
  - Total: 28,541
  - Density: 18,200/km^{2} (47,100/sq mi)

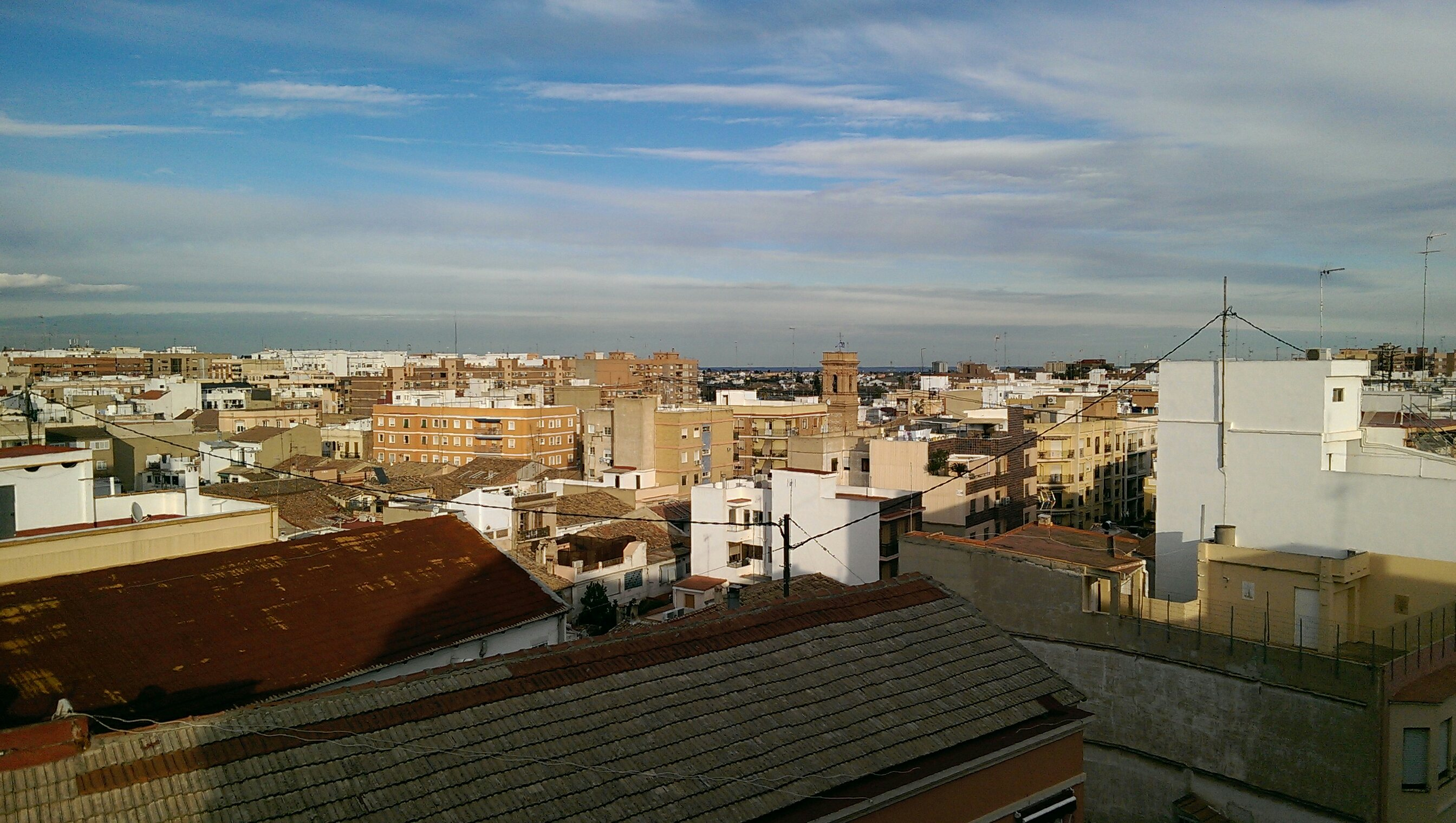
Benimaclet skyline

Benimaclet (Valencian pronunciation: [benimaˈklet]) city is a former village which is now part of the city of Valencia, Spain. The placename is of Arabic origin dating from Moorish times (Arabic بني مخلد, banī Maḫlad, "sons of Majlad"). It is located in the north east of the city and borders the districts of Orriols in the west, the University of Valencia district in the east the Primat Reig area in the south and the town of Alboraia in the north. Benimaclet is, by extension, the name of the postal district 46020 of the city of Valencia. This postal district unites the district with the more recently urbanised neighbouring areas such as Camí de Vera which includes the Polytechnic University of Valencia. Extensive building has meant that the final parts of the rural area known as l'horta have vanished in Benimaclet since the late 1980s.

== History ==
Modern Benimaclet has been completely absorbed by Valencia city, however it has historically been proud of its own identity, with its own church, main square and a street layout more reminiscent of a small village than a city district. Old notices in some streets still speak of “The town of Benimaclet.” From the end of the 16th century until 1878, Benimaclet was an independent local council having its own mayor after which it became part of the city of Valencia. The last vestiges of local sovereignty ended in 1970.

It is the district in which most students live mainly due to its proximity to the University campuses. It also contains a large number of local associations and groups such as the Residents association of Benimaclet or the numerous fallas committees (casals fallers). It is also one of the districts in the city where a large number of people majority speak Valencian in daily life, and it is also considered by some as the most important focal point of young Valencian nationalism in Valencia city, with activities and festivals like the Benimaclet carnival season (Carnestoltes). The area has also become increasingly popular with immigrants due to its relatively low cost housing.

Since 1995 Benimaclet has been connected to central Valencia by the metro stations of Benimaclet and Machado. Additionally a tram network was opened in 1994 which connects Benimaclet to the beach area at Las Arenas/Malvarosa and to outlying suburbs and towns in the north west such as Valterna and La Coma.

== Culture ==
The Benimaclet Neighbours' Association (Associació de Veïns i Veïnes de Benimaclet) was founded in 1974, although it was not legalised until 1976. The reason for its creation was to demand better public services, the first of which being a less dangerous train.

Today, there are 30 cultural and social entities in Benimaclet. Some of which are:

- The music band of the Centro Instructivo Musical de Benimaclet, which was founded in 1910 and has 75 musicians.
- Huertos Urbanos de Benimaclet: With the help of the Benimaclet residents' association, in 2012 a group of people decided to rehabilitate an abandoned area. The Benimaclet urban gardens are a self-management project that has enabled the recovery of abandoned land by converting it into productive vegetable garden.

=== Architectural heritage ===
- Alquería Panach: This is an 18th-century "chincheta" building, one of the few remaining examples of this period in the town. It is in a poor state of conservation, having fallen prey to a fire in 2006.
- Ermita de Vera Sanctuary (Santuari Ermita de Vera): The origin of this hermitage dates back to the 15th century, however the current temple corresponds to a reconstruction carried out in the 18th century. It forms an architectural ensemble with the Vera mill. The two present-day gates are next to each other and share a protective porch. Another historical element attached to the mill is the "hoyo", a water spring that once allowed the mill to be built. This spring connects the architectural complex with the marshland and lagoons that surrounded it until the 18th century.
- Church of the Assumption of Our Lady(Església de l'Assumpció de la Mare de Déu)The parish church was erected at Christmas 1594 by San Juan de Ribera. In 1693, the first repairs were made to the parish church; and in 1745, after 15 years of work, the construction of the bell tower, attached to the church, was completed. Construction of the Chapel of the Santísimo Cristo de la Providencia was completed in the 1990s, carried out by Juan Luis Orquín Roig. The prevailing style in the parish church is neoclassical, except for the chapel, which is neo-Romanesque.

=== Festivities ===
- Patron Saint festivities: Festivities in honour of the Santísimio Cristo de la Providencia and the Santos Patronos Abdón y Senén. The Brotherhood of the Christ of Providence, an entity founded in the 16th century, organises the patron saint festivities in September. The Clavarios del Cristo de la Providencia are in charge of organising and celebrating the events.
- Fiestas of San Antonio: Festivities in honour of San Antonio de Padua. Even though this celebration was lost in the early 1930s, in June 2022 this tradition was recovered.
- Fallas: Fallas is the main festivity of the city of Valencia and it is celebrated in March. The neighbourhood has numerous casales falleros, who are responsible for setting up the street sculptures known as fallas. The oldest falla in the neighbourhood was the Falla Barón de San Petrillo- Enrique Navarro-Leonor Jovani set up in 1942.
- conFusiòn Fest, Festival of Free Expression: Since 2014, Benimaclet has organized a festival every October to share and celebrate creativity and strengthen neighbourhood bonds.
