= Minyons de Terrassa =

Group of castellers from Terrassa

- Foundation: 1979
- Shirt color: Malva
- Location: Terrassa, Vallès Occidental
- Premises: Casa Jacint Bosch; Carrer del Teatre, 4-6
- Group leader: Àlex Riveiro (2022)
- President: Jaume Maeso (2022)
- Best towers: 4 in 10 with triple base 3 in 10 with triple base 4 in 9 with single base 3 in with double base and the wedge
- Best performance: 4 in 9 with single base, 5 in 9 with double base, 3 in 9 with double base, pillar of 7 with double base
- Highlighted performance: Festa Major de Terrassa (July); Diada dels Minyons de Terrassa (November)
- Official website: www.minyons.cat

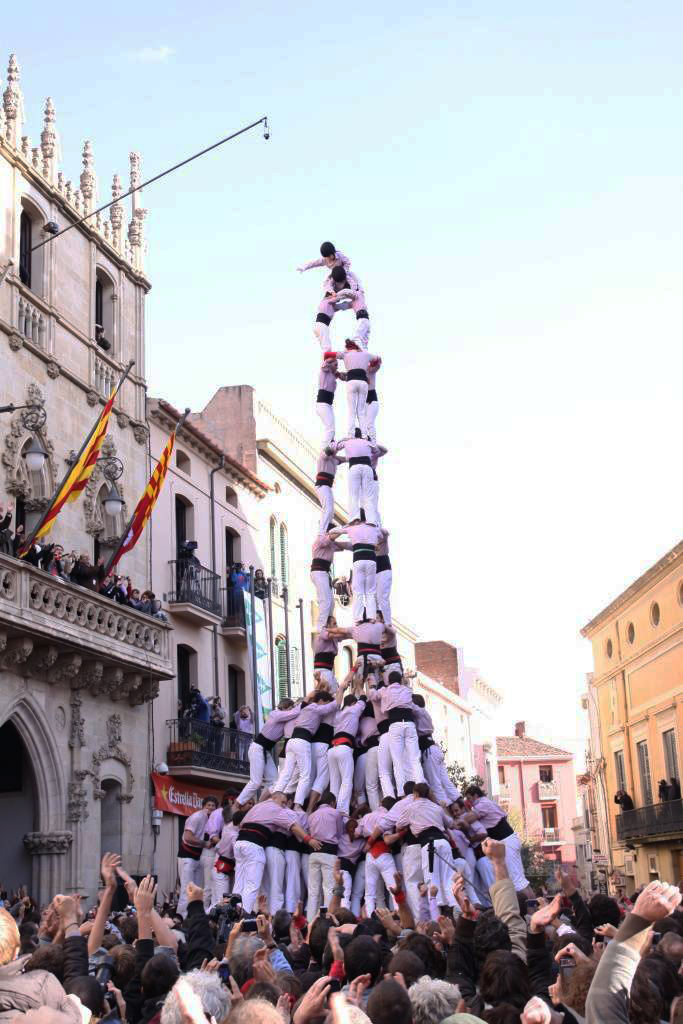
3 in 10 with triple base crowned in Terrassa, 21 November 2010

Minyons de Terrassa is a group of castellers from Terrassa founded on 21 June 1979 and publicly presented on 14 July 1979.

On 22 November 2015, they became the first group ever to successfully complete and dismantle a 4 de 10 amb folre i manilles.
