= 3 in 8 =

Castellers human tower

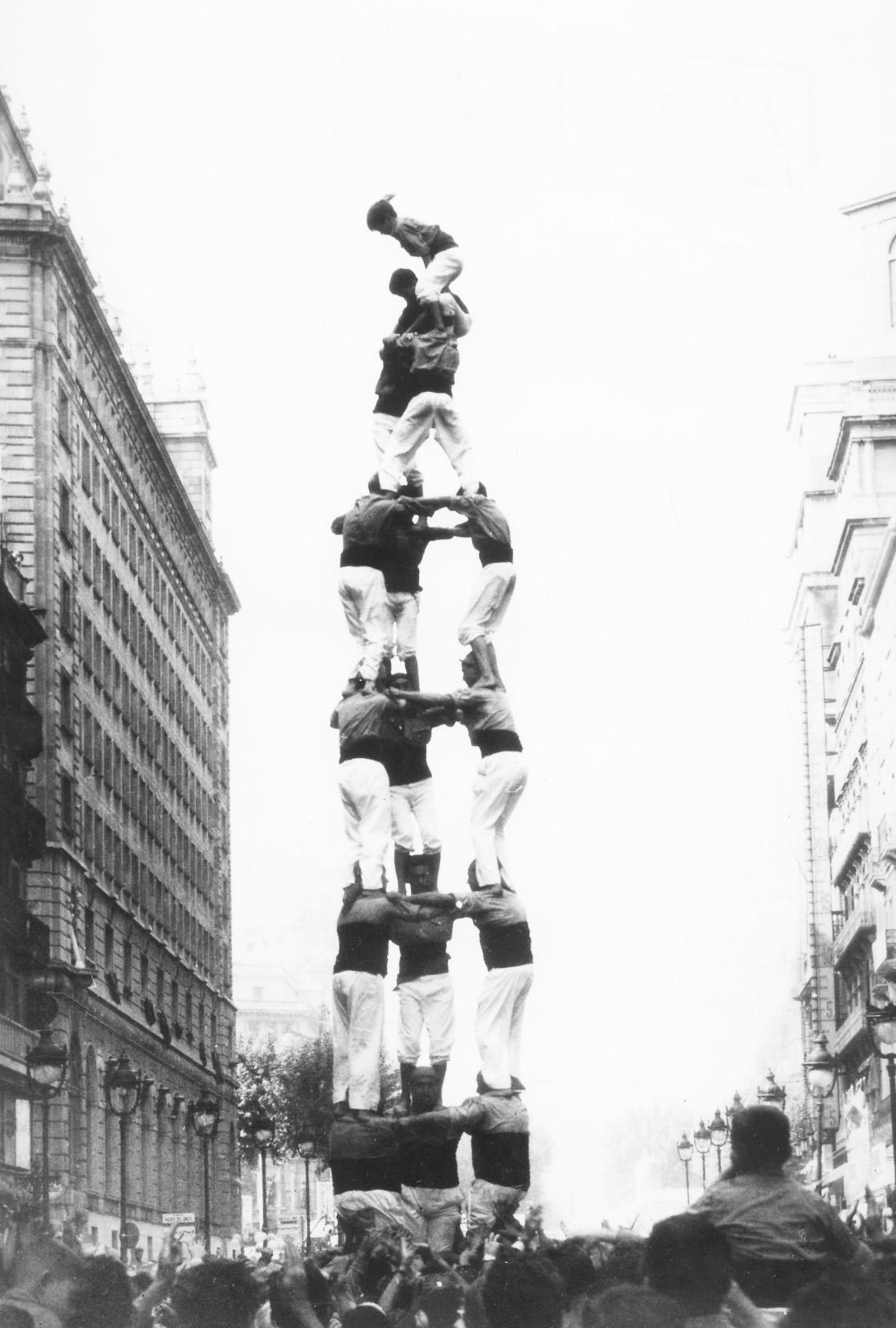
3 in 8 (crowned) by Colla Vella dels Xiquets de Valls in Barcelona in 1966.

3 in 8, which in Catalan is called 3 de 8, is a castellers human tower with 8 levels and 3 people per level in the trunk, except for the last three levels called the top crown (pom de dalt in Catalan), which, like in most other castells, consists of the pair (dosos), a bending child (acotxador) and the crowner (enxaneta). One of the pairs, called the right pair (dos dret), stands on the shoulder of a casteller of the fifth level, completing the main row usually called rengla, while the other pair, called open pair (dos obert), stands with its legs open with one foot in each of the other castellers shoulder. The other two rows are called the right and left rows (dreta and esquerra), or the full and empty rows (plena and buida). The bending child climbs up through the left/empty row, while the crowner and the open pair climb up through the right/full row. Once crowned, the crowner climbs down using the main row.
