= 4 in 8 =

Human tower

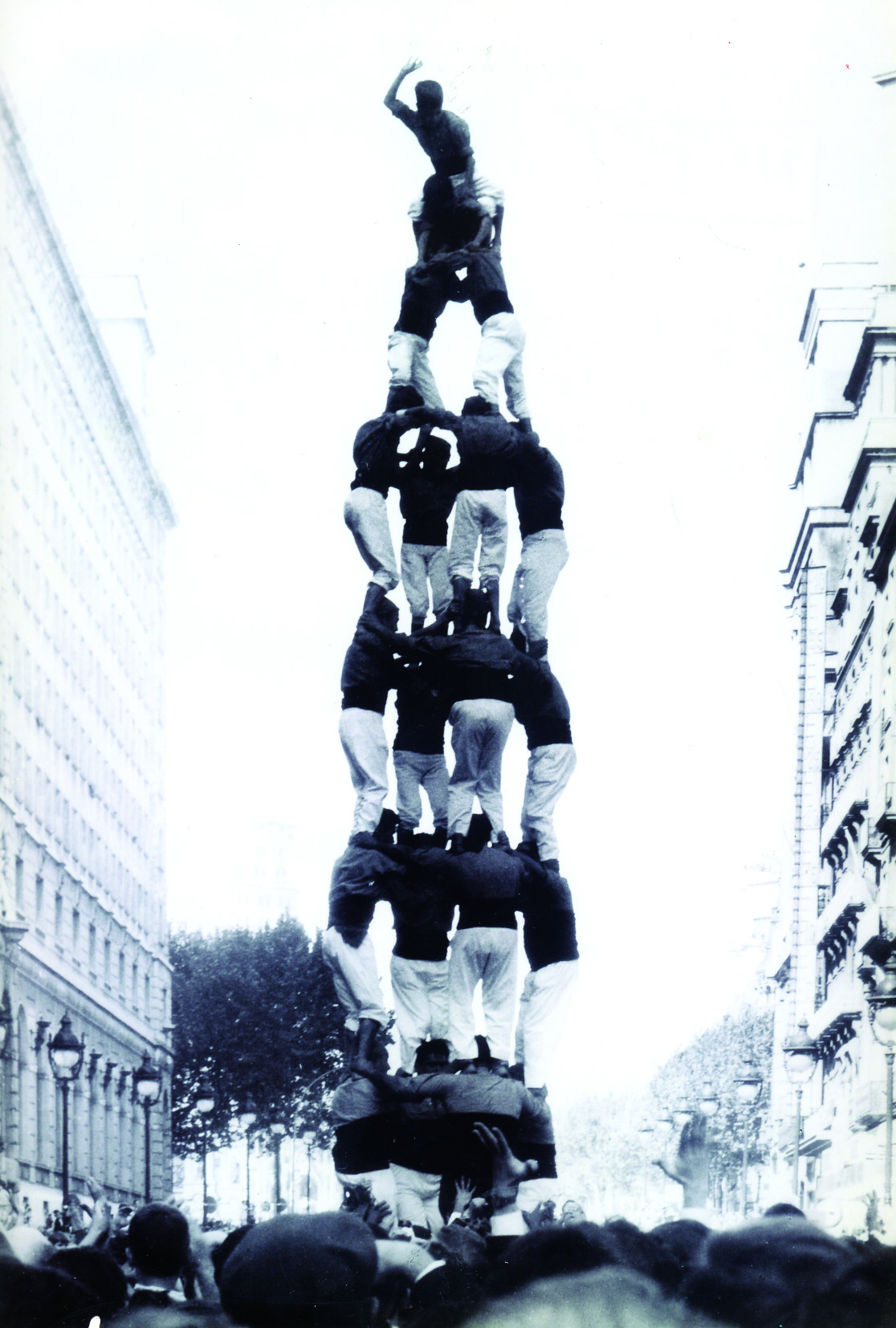
4 in 8 by Colla Vella dels Xiquets de Valls in Barcelona, 1965

4 in 8, which in Catalan is called 4 de 8, is a castellers human tower with 8 levels and 4 people per level in the trunk, except for the last three levels called the top crown (pom de dalt in Catalan), which, like in most other castells, consists of the pair (dosos), a bending child (acotxador) and the crowner (enxaneta). It is usually the first structure with 8 levels that groups of castellers complete. It is often referred as carro gros.
