= Ganjou Brothers and Juanita =

- c. 1935
- Formation: 1931
- Dissolved: 1957
- Type: Theatre group
- Purpose: Adagio cabaret act
- Location: Britain, U.S.
- Members: George Ganjou; Bob Ganjou; Serge Ganjou; Juanita Richards; Joy Marlowe

The Ganjou Brothers and Juanita were a popular variety act based in Britain between 1930 and the 1950s. They performed an adagio act, with the three men throwing and catching the woman in a graceful and acrobatic manner, and were regarded as the pre-eminent act of their type.

== Origins ==
The three Ganjou brothers were born in the Russian Empire, the sons of Dimitri Ganzulewicz. George Ganjou (1901–1988) was born Georgi Ganzulewicz in Chernigov (Chernihiv), now in Ukraine. Bob Ganjou (1902–1972) was born Bogdan Ganzulewicz in Chernigov. Serge Ganjou (1904–1998) was born Sergiusz Ganzulewicz in Siedlce, now in Poland. Their surname is often given as Ganjoulevitch.

The family moved around in eastern Europe and took various menial jobs. They moved from Warsaw to Moscow at the start of the First World War, and then to southern Russia during the 1917 Revolution. The eldest brother, Georgi, joined the Polish Army before performing as an orchestral flautist, and then emigrated to Canada and on to the United States as a musician. Bogdan - who became known as Bob - went from Russia to Turkey, and then to New York. Sergiusz - later Serge - remained in Warsaw for some time as a student, and then as a performer of gypsy music in cafés and concert parties.

In New York in the 1920s, Bob started performing a traditional adagio act with Russian ballerina Natacha Nattova, and another man. When Nattova married Nicholas Daks, her husband joined the act, and it became the first act in which three men threw the woman performer, achieving greater heights than its predecessors in which there had only been one thrower and one catcher. Billed as Natasha Nattova and Company, the act created a sensation, and appeared in the MGM film The Hollywood Revue of 1929. Soon afterwards, Nattova decided to resume her earlier solo career. Bob Ganjou then formed a similar act with George, and a Danish acrobat, William Hendricks, initially calling themselves "Pantus, Coatus and Vestus".

== Formation and success ==
When Hendricks left in 1931, they were joined by brother Serge, and by a female ballet-trained artist's model, Detroit-born Juanita Richards. Billed as the Ganjou Brothers and Juanita, they travelled to England in 1933, and appeared at that year's Royal Variety Performance, when they were supplemented by two opera singers, Aline Fournier and Vittorio Toso. They all dressed in the style of Dresden china figures, and were billed as A Romance in Porcelain. They toured theatres in Britain, achieving considerable popularity, but in 1934 Juanita left to marry an English man she had met in Blackpool.

Her replacement – who retained the stage name of Juanita – was London-born Joy Marlowe (1912–1992), who had studied at the Italia Conti Stage School and joined the brothers onstage after two weeks training. They continued to tour and became successful internationally, being "one of the very few speciality acrobatic acts ever to top a bill", and, in the 1940s, "one of the highest paid acts" on the variety show circuit. They toured America, Australia and New Zealand, and gave a ten-minute performance in the 1943 film Variety Jubilee. In the film, they appeared on a set made to look like a mantelpiece with an ornate clock, on which "Juanita" formed the pendulum.

She then comes out of the clock, and the team begin their routine; after some simple dance movements they begin the complicated and dangerous-looking acrobatic routines; and Joy Marlowe smiles bravely as two of the men spin her round or throw her, spinning rapidly, into the air for the remaining man to catch. She poses while the three men hold her aloft; two of the men hold her by a wrist and ankle each and swing her in an arc which increases to a full circle; then one man at a time, holding her by one wrist and ankle, spins round, passing her in mid-air to another man who continues the arc from her other side. All this is performed elegantly and fitted in closely with the music, in this case The Blue Danube.

George's wife Adele was the group's musical director. They continued to perform the act through the early 1950s, appearing regularly on television, before retiring in 1957. Joy Marlowe and Serge Ganjou married in Las Vegas during their farewell tour.

== Later activities ==
George Ganjou became a theatrical agent in London. In 1958, he spotted young singer Cliff Richard singing at a matinee show in Shepherd's Bush, and arranged for him to record his first demo record, which won him a record deal with Norrie Paramor at the Columbia record label. George Ganjou died in 1988.

Bob Ganjou devised and managed a new adagio act, the Dior Dancers, comprising three younger male performers and a young woman, Merian Morris. They were immediately successful, and appeared in the Royal Variety Performance in 1958 and 1959, and took residencies at Folies Bergere at The Tropicana Hotel Las Vegas through 1967. Bob Ganjou married Merian Morris in 1962, and died in 1972.

Serge Ganjou ran a Polish restaurant in London, and a small electronics factory. He was an active member of the Variety Artistes' Federation, and of the Grand Order of Water Rats (GOWR) show business charity; his wife Joy became "Queen Ratling" of its sister organisation, the Grand Order of Lady Ratlings, in 1961. Joy died in 1992, and Serge in 1998.

There is a memorial to the Ganjou Brothers and Juanita, "The World's Greatest Variety Act", at Streatham Park Cemetery in London.
