= Natacha Nattova =

Russian-born American adagio dancer

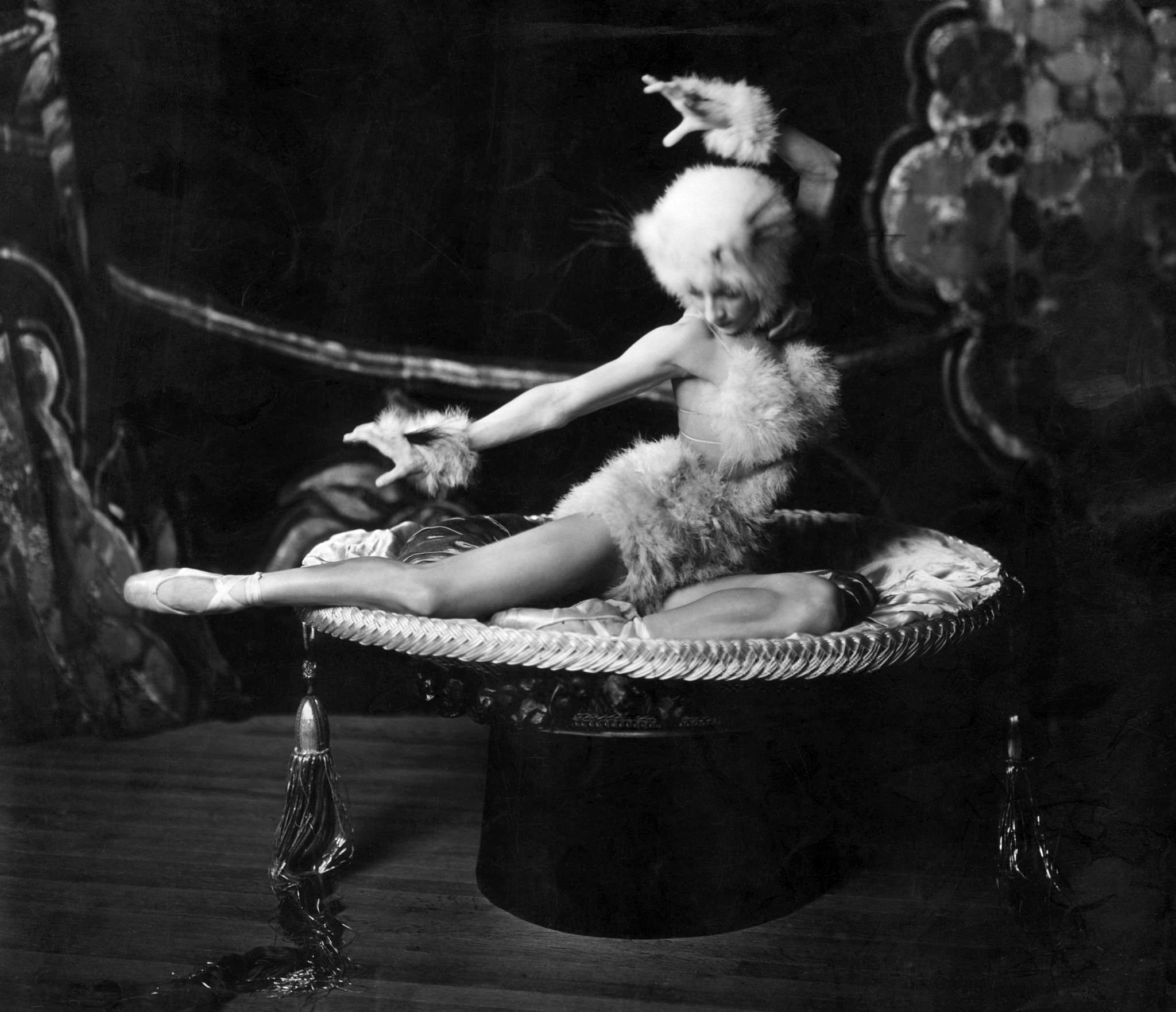
- Nattova performing, 1925
- Born: Nathalie Schmit; August 8, 1905; Saint Petersburg, Russian Empire
- Died: March 7, 1988 (aged 82); Pasadena, California, U. S.
- Citizenship: U.S.
- Occupations: Dancer, set designer
- Years active: 1923–c.1935

Natacha Nattova (born Nathalie Schmit; August 8, 1905 – March 7, 1988) was a Russian-born American adagio dancer, who was a star of the vaudeville circuit in the 1920s and 1930s.

== Biography ==
She was born in Saint Petersburg, but fled Russia with her parents during the 1917 Revolution and settled in Nice. She became a student at the Paris Opéra, and was attracted to modern dance. In 1923, she worked as a featured dancer in the revue Paris Sans Voiles, a showcase for the Dolly Sisters at Café des Ambassadeurs, and later that year danced in another show, Impressions-Musicale at the Gaumont-Palace.

In 1924, after adopting the name Nattova, she teamed up with French dancer Gene Myrio (born Henri Jean Raoul Delteil, 1899–1975). The pair headlined at the nightclub Au Canari as an adagio team, combining dance with graceful acrobatics. The impresario Albert de Courville then booked them to appear in a revue at the London Palladium. They were very successful, the British magazine Theatre World commenting that their dancing was "exquisite and of a quality rarely seen outside the Russian ballet." Nattova was seen as beautiful and creative, designing her own sets and costumes, but also had a volatile temperament. She and Myrio appeared in de Courville's next production, Sky High in 1925, alongside Australian performers Toots and Lorna Pounds. However, there was tension between Nattova and the sisters, and she and Myrio left the show. They performed together in other cabaret shows in London, where they were seen by American booking agent William Morris, who offered them a place in the New York show The Greenwich Village Follies.

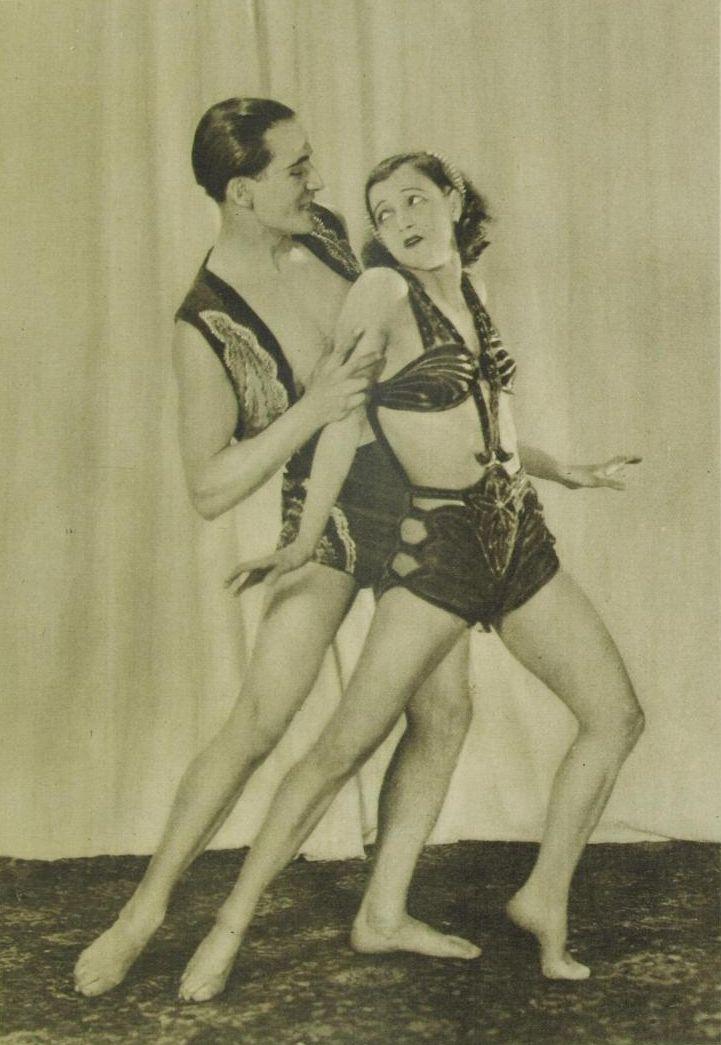
Nattova and Rodion, 1928

Nattova and Myrio gave their first performances in New York in November 1925, and were an immediate sensation, at one point each night Nattova leaping some 15 feet into Myrio's arms. They toured with the show, but in rehearsing a new move Nattova fell, rendering her unconscious and breaking her nose. After her recovery, Myrio decided to leave, Nattova got into a fight with her understudy, and she was dropped from the roster of the Jones and Green theatrical company. She continued to perform, with a new dance partner, Russian-born Rodion Gritzanov (1896–1968), and from 1926 to 1928 the pair toured as Nattova and Rodion. They featured a "Moth and Flame" dance act, which was regarded as being more sensational than that of their rivals. However, Nattova's temperament again led to problems, and she was involved in legal actions against managers and agents. She also had another fall, breaking her ankle, and Rodion decided to leave the pairing.

While recuperating, Nattova devised a new act in which the set appeared to deliver a series of male dancers through an automated assembly line. She said: "I am to represent electricity. I shall dance with each partner for a while, then give them back to the machine." She returned to the Keith vaudeville circuit, this time with Bob Ganjou and another male dancer, billed as Nattova and Company. The act was joined by a third man, Nicholas Gakkel Daks (1899–1978); he and Nattova married in October 1928. They continued to tour, and appeared in the MGM feature-length musical film The Hollywood Revue of 1929. In 1930, Nattova joined with Daks, Bob Ganjou and his brother George Ganjou, in what she called a "Geometrics" act, part of which incorporated a luminous skeleton costume. The Ganjou brothers later formed their own troupe, with a third brother and another female dancer.

At the height of her fame, Nattova modelled for a sculpture by Serge Youriévitch, La danseuse Nattova, which became popular and widely reproduced. From 1931 Nattova worked as a solo adagio act, introducing her "Dance of the Wind", in which "she used an enormous jardinière sprouting large stylized flowers with each blossom a firm metal platform upon which to leap with breath-taking abandon. Flying through space, she executed an arabesque on an azalea, a pirouette on a poppy and a toe-hold on a tulip."

Her act was incorporated into a theatre presentation which toured through 1932. After a tour of Europe, she returned to New York in 1934 with an act that also included a dance on the theme of "what would happen if a demon inventor created a radio ray that would control the thoughts of humans." Her final performances seem to have been in 1935 at the Radio City Music Hall, as part of an adagio trio, and with a troupe of male dancers, including Daks.

She retired from performance before 1940, and lived in New York with Daks. They later divorced. In the 1950s, she moved to Los Angeles, where (as Natalie Daks) she was involved in arts and crafts activities. She died in Pasadena in 1988, aged 82.
