= Edward George Warris Hulton =

British magazine publisher and writer

- Born: 29 November 1906; Harrogate, England
- Died: 8 October 1988 (aged 81); London, England
- Occupation: Magazine publisher
- Known for: Pioneer of photojournalism Founder of Hulton Archive
- Spouse(s): Kira Goudime-Levkovitsch (m. 1927); Princess Nika Yourievitch (m. 1946)
- Children: 3
- Relatives: Edward Hulton (grandfather); Sir Edward Hulton, 1st Baronet (father); Sir Jocelyn Stevens (nephew); Serge Yourievitch (father-in-law)

Sir Edward George Warris Hulton (29 November 1906 – 8 October 1988) was a British magazine publisher and writer.

== Early life ==
Hulton was born to Sir Edward Hulton, 1st Baronet, a newspaper publisher and racehorse owner originally from Manchester, and his second wife, music hall artist, actress and singer Millicent Warris, born Fanny Elizabeth Warriss or Wariss, also known by the stage name Millie Lindon. Educated at Harrow School, Hulton went up to Brasenose College, Oxford, in 1925 but left in December 1926 without a degree.

== Business and politics ==
Hulton founded the Hulton Press in 1937, buying Farmers' Weekly. The Hulton Press went on to publish Leader Magazine, Lilliput and the Picture Post, as well as the children's comics Eagle, Girl, Robin, and Swift.

During World War II, Hulton was one of the members of the 1941 Committee, a group of British politicians, writers and other people of influence not generally involved with a political party but who came together in 1941 to press for more efficient production to enhance the war effort. Hulton helped fund the Home Guard training school at Osterley Park, organising a private supply of weapons from the United States. Though he had stood unsuccessfully as a Conservative candidate at Leek in 1929, his 1943 book The New Age supported a mixed welfare-state economy and he welcomed Attlee's 1945 government.

Hulton discontinued the Picture Post in 1957 and sold the Hulton Press to Odhams two years later. He was knighted for services to journalism in 1957.

== Hulton photographic archive ==
The photographic archive of Picture Post became an important historical documentary resource. It was set up by Hulton as a semi-independent operation, officially incorporated as the Hulton Press Library in 1947. It was bought by the BBC in 1958 and incorporated into the Radio Times photo archive, which was then sold to Brian Deutsch in 1988. In 1996 the Hulton Picture Collection was bought for £8.6m by Getty Images, who has retained the Hulton Archive as a featured resource within its large holdings.

== Publications ==
- When I was a Child. London: Springwood Books. 1978. ISBN 9780905947709.

== Personal life ==
Hulton was married twice, first to Kira Goudime-Levkovitsch in 1927, and then later in 1946 to Princess Nika Yourievitch. Together Yourievitch and Hulton had two sons and one daughter. The marriage between Yourievitch and Hulton was dissolved in 1966, though the two lived together again for the last nine years of Hulton's life before he died on 8 October 1988.
