= Princess Nika Yourievitch =

French socialite and author (1916 – 1995)

- Born: 2 August 1916; Paris, France
- Died: 17 September 1995 (aged 79)
- Buried: Sainte-Geneviève-des-Bois Russian Cemetery, Paris, France
- Spouse: Sir Edward Hulton (1941–1966)
- Issue: 3
- Father: Prince Serge Youriévitch
- Mother: Princess Helene de Lipovatz
- Relatives: Sir Edward Hulton, 1st Baronet; Elena of Montenegro

Princess Nika Yourievitch (formerly Lady Hulton; 2 August 1916 – 17 September 1995) was a French-born socialite and author, descended from Russian and Montenegrin nobility. She married Sir Edward George Warris Hulton, son of Sir Edward Hulton, 1st Baronet.

Yourievitch was described as "very good-looking, wild and extravagant" by Woodrow Wyatt, regularly hosted grand parties in London, and was very involved in the high society social scene of the time. She was also known for her large art collection.

== Biography ==
Princess Nika Yourievitch was born on 2 August 1916, the second daughter of Prince Serge Youriévitch, a sculptor and diplomat of Russian nobility, and Montenegrin Princess Helene de Lipovatz. Princess Lipovatz was the daughter of Prince Jovan Popović-Lipovac (Serbian: Јован Поповић-Липовац), a Montenegrin prince and Russian Imperial Army general. General Popović-Lipovac led the 48th Division in the Russian Civil War, where he was wounded. Princess Lipovatz was also cousin of Princess Elena Petrović-Njegoš of Montenegro, making Yourievitch first cousins once removed to the Queen of Italy.

Princess Nika's father Serge had served as chamberlain to the last Emperor, Nicholas II of Russia. He was a friend and pupil of the sculptor Auguste Rodin before becoming an accomplished sculptor himself, connecting his family to French art society.

Princess Nika was brought up in Paris, where many Russian nobility fled after the Russian Revolution. Her parents lived between Paris and Russia, and after the fall of the Imperial reign lost their Russian property in Saratov.

In 1941, Yourievitch married media magnate Sir Edward George Warris Hulton as his second wife. Hulton had formerly been married to Kira Goudime-Levkovitsch, another Russian aristocrat who had fled Russia after Nicholas II's fall.

Together, Yourievitch and Hulton had two sons and one daughter: Edward Alexander Sergius Hulton, Cosmo Philip Paul Hulton, and Elizabeth Frances Helen Hulton.

The marriage between Yourievitch and Hulton was dissolved in 1966, though the two lived together again for the last nine years of Hulton's life before he died on 8 October 1988.

== Death ==
Yourievitch died 17 September 1995. She was buried in the Sainte-Geneviève-des-Bois Russian Cemetery in France, alongside her parents and Hulton.

== Other ==
Yourievitch was also noted for her renowned collection of Paul Klee artwork.

== Works ==
- Lady Nika Hulton (1958). First Steps in Art Appreciation. New York: Pitman Pub. Corp.
- Lady Nika Hulton (1960). The Witch. Rupert Hart-Davis.
- Lady Nika Hulton (1977). The General. London: Springwood Books Ltd. ISBN 9780905947105.
