= Farmers Weekly =

Magazine published in the United Kingdom

- Editor: Andrew Meredith
- Former editors: Karl Schneider
- Categories: Trade magazine
- Frequency: Weekly
- Total circulation: 44,000
- First issue: June 22, 1934; 92 years ago
- Company: Mark Allen Group
- Country: United Kingdom
- Based in: Sutton
- Language: English
- Website: fwi.co.uk
- ISSN: 0014-8474

Farmers Weekly is a magazine aimed at the British farming industry. It provides news; business features; a weekly digest of facts and figures about British, European and world agriculture; and livestock, arable and machinery sections with reports on technical developments, farm sales and analysis of prices. It has both charted and captured agricultural changes. It has been vocal in its advocacy for the farming sector.

== History and profile ==
The first issue of The Farmers Weekly was on 22 June 1934, costing 2d. It claimed to be a newspaper of the soil and aimed to increase agricultural production in the United Kingdom. It has captured and charted agricultural changes. It was acquired by Edward George Warris Hulton in 1937. The magazine is published weekly on Fridays, typically 51 times per year. Farmers Weekly has published books including Farmhouse Fare (1935) and Home Made Country Wines (1955), both consisting of recipes contributed by readers of the magazine.

In the 1930s, Farmers Weekly average circulation per issue was 100,000 copies. In 2004, it had an average circulation of 77,233; by 2013, this had fallen to 59,328; in 2018, average circulation was 44,023 per issue.

On 4 May 1951 it published a double-page spread on the changes in one hundred years of farming between 1851 and the Great Exhibition and 1951 the Festival of Britain. In the article it made the case for farming to be seen as a modern industry and a public good. It also made the case for national recognition for the hard-working countryside people.

Farmers Weekly Interactive (FWi) is the online home of Farmers Weekly, with 623,231 unique visitors per month visiting the FWi website.

Related events include the Farmers Weekly Awards (which celebrates British agriculture and features influential farmers), Soils In Practice, and Ag Careers Live. The publisher also runs projects including Farmers Apprentice (first launched in 2014 and run bi-annually), the Young Farmers Festival and Britain's Fittest Farmer competition, which was launched in March 2019 and highlights the need for farmers to take time out to focus on their physical health and mental wellbeing.

Farmers Weekly was part of Proagrica, which includes other products such as "Farmplan", "Sirrus" and other precision agriculture software, until its sale to MA Agriculture Limited. Proagrica is owned by Reed Business Information and is based in Sutton in Surrey. In December 2019, RBI announced plans to sell the magazine title, website and related platforms, events and awards to MA Agriculture Limited, part of the Mark Allen Group.

In 2019 it was announced that the Mark Allen Group, a specialist publisher, was ready to buy Farmers Weekly from Reed Business Information.
