= June Pursell =

American singer-songwriter

Photo of Pursell in 1932

June Pursell (also known as June Purcell) was an American singer, songwriter, and actress, who also played the ukulele. Born as Mary Pursell on December 16, 1902, in Indianapolis, Indiana, she made notable contributions to the world of music and film during her career.

== Information ==
Pursell had no intentions of entering show business, but after her father died, she was tasked with supporting the family. Pursell then broke her arm and performed some of her earliest gigs with her arm in a sling. Pursell was initially offered $150 per week to perform and later passed an audition for the KNX radio station. While her first performance was not popular with the main KNX announcer, she received a lot of fan-mail and was hired.

Pursell's vocal talents gained recognition in the 1920s and 1930s. She was signed with NBC and was compared to Nora Bayes. She became known as "The KNX Girl" and deemed "the girl with the ballad voice". Between 1925 and 1932, she recorded for both the Victor and Brunswick labels. From 1929 to 1931 she sang and recorded with Earl Burtnett and his Los Angeles Biltmore Hotel Orchestra, and in 1932 she sang and recorded with Jack Denny and his Waldoff-Astoria Orchestra. These recordings showcased her versatile abilities as a soprano solo artist, as well as her collaborations with esteemed band leaders such as Roy Fox, Earl Burtnett, and Jack Denny. June Pursell's soprano voice captivated audiences and earned her a place among the prominent singers of her time. Pursell also made notable appearances in two films: "The Hollywood Revue" in 1929 and "Viennese Nights" in 1930. These appearances allowed Pursell to display her talents to a wider audience.

As a songwriter, Pursell wrote several songs including "What Good Am I Without You" and "I Couldn't Love You More If I Tried", both copyrighted in 1956.

== Personal life ==
Pursell married Thomas H. Culkin in January 1952. Pursell's surname was often misspelled as "Purcell".
