= Viennese Nights =

1930 film

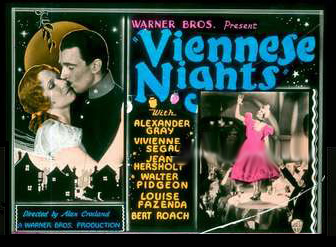
- Lantern slide
- Directed by: Alan Crosland
- Written by: Oscar Hammerstein II; Sigmund Romberg
- Produced by: Richard Rodgers
- Starring: Alexander Gray; Vivienne Segal; Walter Pidgeon; Jean Hersholt; Louise Fazenda; Bela Lugosi
- Cinematography: James Van Trees
- Edited by: Hal McLaren
- Music by: Oscar Hammerstein II; Sigmund Romberg; Bela Lugosi
- Color process: Technicolor Process 3
- Production company: Warner Bros. Pictures
- Distributed by: Warner Bros. Pictures
- Release date: November 26, 1930
- Running time: 95 minutes
- Country: United States
- Language: English
- Budget: $604,000
- Box office: $950,000

Viennese Nights is a 1930 American all-talking pre-Code musical operetta film directed by Alan Crosland and starring Alexander Gray, Vivienne Segal, Walter Pidgeon, Jean Hersholt, Bela Lugosi and Louise Fazenda. It was photographed entirely in Technicolor and released by Warner Bros. Pictures. Viennese Nights was the first original operetta written especially for the screen by Oscar Hammerstein II and Sigmund Romberg. It was filmed in March and April 1930, before anyone realized the extent of the economic hardships that would arrive with the Great Depression, which had begun in the autumn of the previous year. Although not a box office hit in the United States, the film had long box office runs in Britain and Australia. It is one of the earliest sound films to have a short pre-credit sequence.

== Plot ==
In 1890 in Vienna, von Renner, Sascher, and Stirner, who are three close friends, are going to join the Austrian army. Eventually, von Renner become a lieutenant and as a superior officer he is forced to distance himself from his two former friends. Stirner and Sascher end up falling in love with a poor girl, Elsa Hofner, who is the daughter of a cobbler. Although Hofner truly loves Stirner, she chooses to marry von Renner because of his wealth and position, believing that money and the social mobility that goes with it will bring her happiness. Stirner is heartbroken and travels to the United States with his friend Sascher. Stirner gets a job playing violin in an orchestra but struggles to support his wife and child. In the course of time, Hofner travels to the United States and meets Stirner and their love is rekindled. Stirner learns of Hefner's unhappy marriage and they plan to make a new life together. Hofner, however, discovers that Stirner is married and has a child. Feeling sorry for Stirner's son, she sacrifices her happiness and returns to von Renner, her husband.

Forty years later, in 1930, Hofner is now a grandmother and she is planning for her granddaughter, Barbara, to marry a wealthy man since the family's fortunes are now on the wane. Barbara, however, falls in love with a composer, who happens to be the grandson of Stirner. Hofner immediately recalls her romance with Stirner and of the mistake she once made. She consents to her granddaughters marriage and reminiscences about the man she really loves, who is now dead. One day after the wedding, while at the park, Hofner sees Stirner and her spirit walks off with him and leaves her body and she is reunited with her long lost love.

== Cast ==
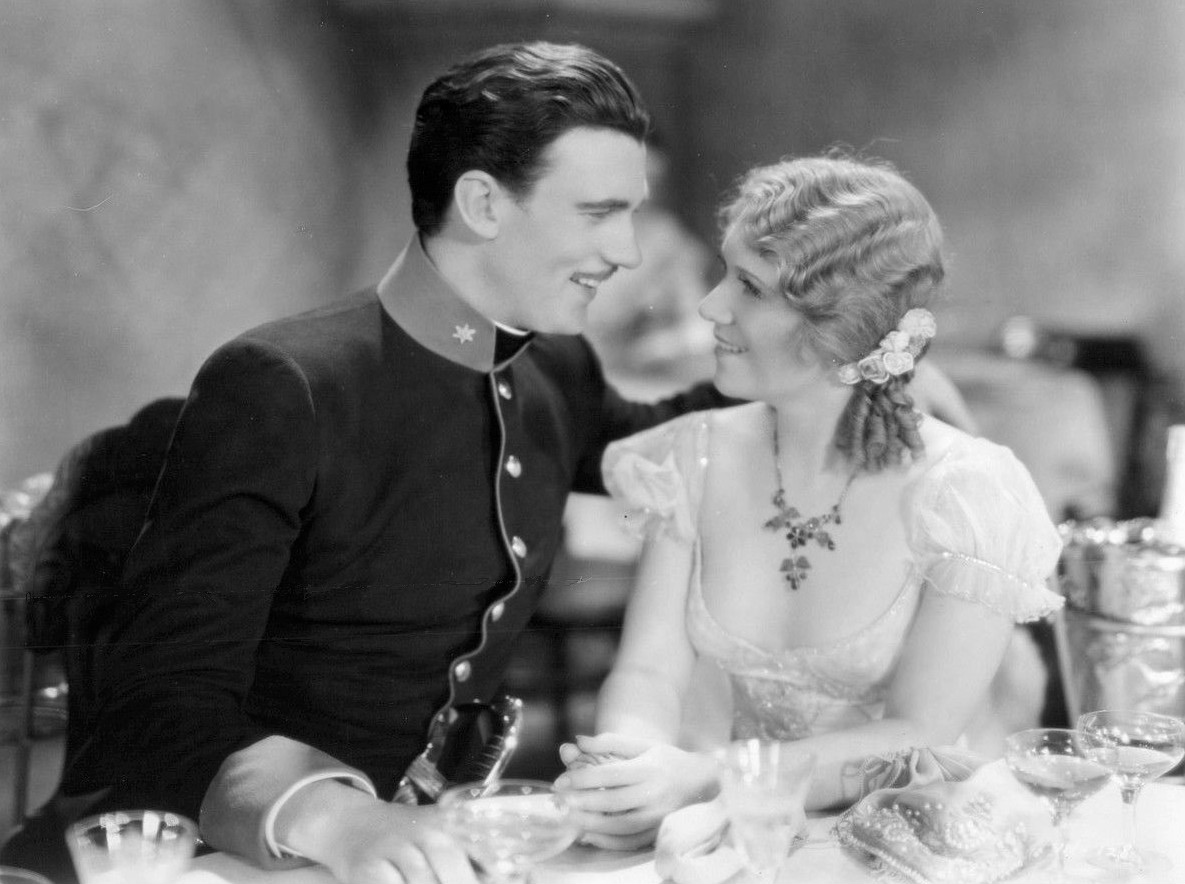
Walter Pidgeon and Vivienne Segal in a scene from the film.

- Alexander Gray as Otto Stirner
- Vivienne Segal as Elsa Hofner
- Walter Pidgeon as Franz von Renner
- Jean Hersholt as Herr Hofner, Elsa's father
- Louise Fazenda as Gretl Kruger
- Bert Roach as Gus Sascher
- Alice Day as Barbara, Elsa's granddaughter
- Bela Lugosi as Count von Ratz, Hungarian Ambassador
- Philipp Lothar Mayring as Baron von Renner, Franz's father
- June Purcell as Mary, a Singer on the stage
- Milt Douglas as Bill Jones, a Stage Performer
- Freddie Burke Frederick as Otto Stirner Jr.
- Dorothy Hammerstein as Socialite next to Elsa in theatre box
- Ullrich Haupt as Hugo, Elsa's rejected suitor
- Isabelle Keith as Franz's Rejected Girlfriend
- Russ Powell as Herr Schultz
- Virginia Sale as Emma Stirner
- Mary Treen as Shocked Woman on street
- Paul Weigel as Man in Vienna opera box
- Biltmore Trio as Trio in 1930 Nightclub singing "Here We Are"

== Production ==
Viennese Nights was the first of four original screen musicals that the team of Sigmund Romberg and Oscar Hammerstein II were to create for Warner Brothers over a two-year period. They were to be paid $100,000 a piece per film against 25 percent of the profits. This deal was made early in 1930, before anyone realized that the Great Depression would be imminent later that year. These economic problems caused studios to stay away from the lavish spectacle of musicals which were now seen as frivolous and anachronistic. Under these circumstances, Warner Brothers were forced to buy out the contract they had signed with the Romberg-Hammerstein team, early in 1931, after their second musical Children of Dreams (1931), which had already been produced, had been released to dismal reviews.

The picture marked Broadway star Vivienne Segal's last starring role in a picture. Segal, who was a star on the stage, was trying to be groomed by Warner Brothers as a competitor to Paramount Pictures' Jeanette MacDonald. Segal's last picture was as a supporting player in MGM's The Cat and the Fiddle, ironically with MacDonald as the star. Viennese Nights also marked operetta singer Alexander Gray's last starring role in a feature.

Among the players, Bela Lugosi makes his first appearance in color in this feature in a bit part as a Hungarian ambassador named Count von Ratz. Lugosi's part was filmed before his claim to fame as the title role in Dracula for Universal Pictures.

Due to the lack of sets, a number of scenes were filmed at other studios, a common practice at that point. The climax of the picture, when the symphony is played, was shot on Universal Picture's Stage 28 theater set, originally built for the Lon Chaney picture The Phantom of the Opera. Viennese Nights marks the third time the set was photographed in Technicolor, the first two being Phantom and The King of Jazz.

== Songs ==
- "You Will Remember Vienna"
- "I Bring a Love Song"
- "When You Have No Man To Love"
- "Goodbye My Love"
- "Here We Are"
- "I'm Bringing You Bad News"
- "I'm Lonely"
- "Oli, Oli, Oli"
- "Otto's Dilemma"
- "Poem Symphonic"
- "Pretty Gypsy"
- "The Regimental March"

== Box office ==
According to Warner Bros records the film earned $343,000 domestic and $607,000 foreign.

== Preservation ==
Unlike most Warner Brothers' early Technicolor films (with a huge number of them existing either only in black and white or are lost completely), Viennese Nights still survives in color. The film survived as a single nitrate Technicolor print in Jack Warner's personal vault on the Burbank lot, and transferred to the UCLA Film & Television Archive, along with the nitrate collection of studio prints. A full set of Vitaphone sound discs was discovered at Warner Bros. in 1988. Additionally, the Vitaphone discs for the Foreign Version (non-dialogue, but English-language songs and musical underscore) has also survived but without picture. The domestic version has been preserved by the UCLA Film & Television Archive, including the overture, intermission, and exit music. The Archive has created a 35mm Eastmancolor preservation negative from that print and the restored showprint has played archival engagements around the world. At the present time the film cannot be shown commercially or on Home Video, without the underlying rights being re-negotiated by the current copyright owner, Warner Bros.

== See also ==
- List of early color feature films
