= The Hollywood Revue =

1929 film

The Hollywood Revue of 1929
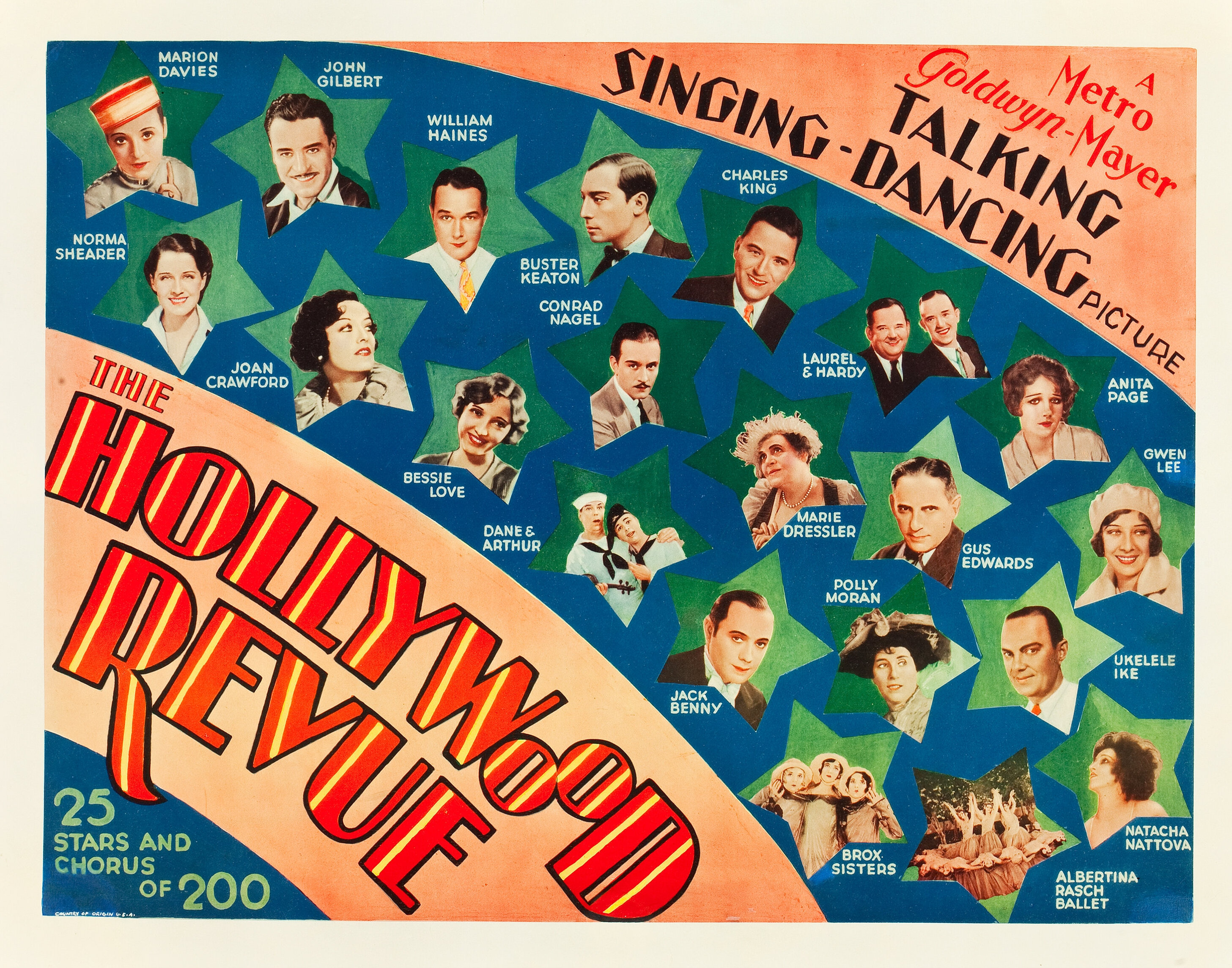
- 1929 Lobby card
- Directed by: Charles Reisner
- Written by: Al Boasberg; Robert E. Hopkins; Joseph W. Farnham
- Produced by: Harry Rapf
- Starring: Conrad Nagel; Jack Benny
- Cinematography: John Arnold; Max Fabian; Irving G. Ries; John M. Nickolaus
- Edited by: William S. Gray; Cameron K. Wood
- Music by: Gus Edwards; Arthur Freed ("Singin' in the Rain"); Nacio Herb Brown ("Singin' in the Rain")
- Distributed by: Metro-Goldwyn-Mayer
- Release date: June 20, 1929 (Los Angeles)
- Running time: 130 minutes (roadshow); 118 min (Turner library print)
- Country: United States
- Language: English
- Budget: $426,000
- Box office: $2,421,000 (worldwide rental)

The Hollywood Revue of 1929, or simply The Hollywood Revue, is a 1929 American pre-Code musical comedy film released by Metro-Goldwyn-Mayer. It was the studio's second feature-length musical, and one of their earliest sound films. Produced by Harry Rapf and directed by Charles Reisner, it features nearly all of MGM's stars in a two-hour revue that includes three segments in Technicolor. The masters of ceremonies are Conrad Nagel and Jack Benny.

At the 2nd Academy Awards, the film received a Best Picture nomination (its sole nomination) but lost to another Irving Thalberg MGM production, The Broadway Melody.

As a film published in 1929, it entered the public domain on January 1, 2025.

== Production ==
The film

The film went into production as The Revue of Revues, and the title was changed in May 1929. John Gilbert, Norma Shearer, Lionel Barrymore, and Marion Davies were added to the cast in June.

Unlike MGM's imposing feature films, which always boasted strong story values, The Hollywood Revue of 1929 is a plotless parade of variety acts. This was a daring gamble for the studio, uncertain if the public would accept an MGM picture with no storyline at all. Conrad Nagel, interviewed for the book The Real Tinsel, recalled, "Everybody thought Harry Rapf was crazy for making it." Billed as an "All-Star Musical Extravaganza", the film includes performances by once and future stars, including Joan Crawford singing and dancing on stage. (She later remarked, "Revue was one of those let's-throw-everyone-on-the-lot-into-a-musical things, but I did a good song-and-dance number."). Other segments feature Gus Edwards, John Gilbert, Norma Shearer, Lionel Barrymore, Buster Keaton, Marie Dressler, Bessie Love, Marion Davies, Anita Page, and the team of Karl Dane and George K. Arthur (popular in MGM's silent comedies but making this single appearance in an MGM sound film).

Highlights of The Hollywood Revue are a comedy routine starring Stan Laurel and Oliver Hardy as inept magicians; Buster Keaton in a "Queen of Sheba" pantomime dance; John Gilbert and Norma Shearer enacting the balcony scene from Romeo and Juliet, first with the original Shakespearean dialogue, then with contemporary slang (this sequence was written by the studio's veteran gagman Joe Farnham); Bessie Love demonstrating her musical-comedy talents; and Cliff Edwards as "Ukulele Ike" singing specialty numbers, including the debut of "Singin' in the Rain". This song was reprised in the all-star finale filmed in Technicolor. It was a last-minute addition to the film, shot late at night on June 10, 1929, just 10 days before the premiere at Grauman's Chinese Theatre. The only major M-G-M stars missing from the revue are Greta Garbo (whose name is mentioned during one of the introductory remarks), Ramon Novarro ("on hiatus at the time of production, studying music in Europe"), and Lon Chaney. At the time, Chaney was under contract to appear in three feature films annually at $5,000 per week. Chaney was willing to appear in The Hollywood Revue if the studio counted it as one of the year's three films at his usual starring salary. MGM refused, and so Chaney does not appear. However, he is invoked during the Gus Edwards specialty song, "Lon Chaney's Gonna Get You If You Don't Watch Out," with a group of extras masquerading as Chaney characters.

Only one sequence was cut from the film: three songs by The Brox Sisters, which was recycled into a short subject, Gems of MGM. Another sequence, a parody of the Albertina Rasch ballet's "pearl dance" by Marie Dressler, was planned but not shot (as the film's production records reveal). Instead, the number was replaced by the Buster Keaton specialty, though Dressler did pose for stills wearing a Lady Godiva wig.

The film is sometimes cited, as on the DVD release of the 1952 Singin' in the Rain, as the film that led to the downfall of Gilbert's career. Gilbert, a popular silent film actor best known for his work opposite Garbo, possessed a pleasant, tenor speaking voice which did not always match his heroic, dashing screen image. The negative effect of Hollywood Revue on Gilbert's career has been overstated, since many contemporary reviews made no criticism of his performance. His problems really began with the next two films he made, His Glorious Night (1929) and Redemption (1930), where he had to recite florid, romantic dialogue during intimate love scenes -- making him look and sound ridiculous.

== Cast ==
- Conrad Nagel (singing voice dubbed by Charles King)
- Jack Benny
- Joan Crawford
- Marion Davies
- John Gilbert
- Norma Shearer
- Charles King
- Bessie Love
- Cliff Edwards
- Anita Page
- Marie Dressler
- Polly Moran
- William Haines
- Buster Keaton
- Stan Laurel
- Oliver Hardy
- George K. Arthur
- Karl Dane
- The Brox Sisters
- Gwen Lee
- Lionel Barrymore
- Gus Edwards
- Albertina Rasch Dancers

== Musical numbers ==
The circulating print of The Hollywood Revue of 1929 runs as follows:

=== Act I ===
- "The Palace of Minstrel" sung and danced by a minstrel chorus
- "Masters of Ceremonies" Jack Benny introduces Conrad Nagel. Charles King and Cliff Edwards interfere.
- "Got a Feeling for You" sung by Joan Crawford
- "Old Folks at Home" sung by chorus
- "Old Black Joe" sung by chorus
- "Low-Down Rhythm" sung and danced by June Purcell
- "Your Mother and Mine" sung by Charles King
- "You Were Meant for Me" "sung" by Conrad Nagel (dubbed by Charles King) to Anita Page
- "Nobody but You" sung by Cliff Edwards
- "Your Mother and Mine" played by Jack Benny on his violin with interjections from Karl Dane and George K. Arthur
- "Cut Up" comedy skit featuring William Haines ripping up Jack Benny's suit
- "I Never Knew I Could Do a Thing Like That" sung by Bessie Love
- "I'm the Queen" sung by Marie Dressler, assisted by Polly Moran
- "Magic Act" introduced by Jack Benny, featuring Laurel and Hardy as magicians in a comedy skit (their first appearance in a sound feature film)
- "Military March" with Marion Davies singing "Oh, What a Man" and "Tommy Atkins on Parade" followed by military drill and dancing. The Brox Sisters conclude this number singing "Strike Up the Band"

=== Intermission ===
- "Nobody But You", "Your Mother and Mine", and "I've Got a Feeling for You" by the orchestra

=== Act II ===
- "The Pearl Ballet" sung by James Burrows, danced by Beth Laemmle and the Albertina Rasch ballet
- "The Dance of the Sea", an "underwater" dance performed by Buster Keaton
- "Lon Chaney's Gonna Get You If You Don't Watch Out" sung by Gus Edwards
- "The Adagio Dance" with the Natova Company
- "Romeo and Juliet" (in two-color Technicolor) with John Gilbert and Norma Shearer, and Lionel Barrymore as director
- "Singin' in the Rain" introduced by Cliff Edwards, with The Brox Sisters
- "Charlie, Ike, and Gus" with Charles King, Cliff Edwards, and Gus Edwards
- "Marie, Polly, and Bess" with Marie Dressler, Polly Moran, and Bessie Love
- "Orange Blossom Time" (in two-color Technicolor), sung by Charles King to Myrtle McLaughlin, danced by the Albertina Rasch Ballet Company
- "Singin' in the Rain" (finale) (in two-color Technicolor), sung by entire cast

== Reception ==
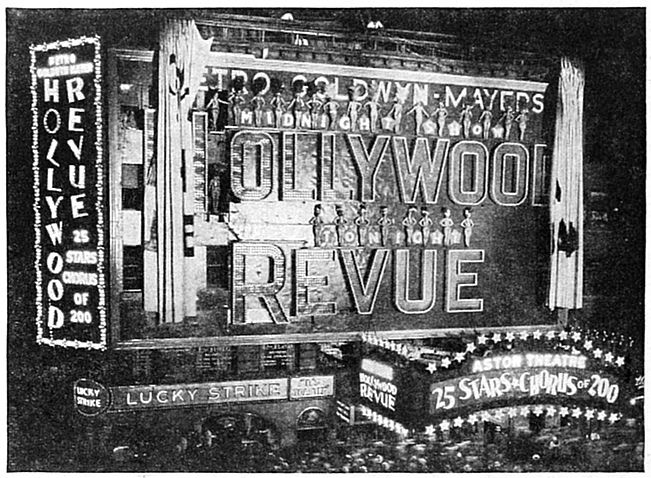
As a stunt, chorus girls dance on the sign of the Astor Theatre in New York City

The film, which was shot in 25 days with a budget of US$426,000, was popular with audiences and critics alike, especially in its initial big-city engagements. "Brimming over with good fun and catchy music", Mordaunt Hall of The New York Times wrote. Variety called it "the top novelty film to be turned out to date....If the theater booths give it an even break, nothing can stop it." Film Daily reported, "A smash and a wow. Smart revue with plenty of comedy beautifully dressed and a cast that is gilt-edged." John Mosher of The New Yorker called it "the most extravagant and extensive musical comedy so far presented by the talking pictures, and is in itself a complete evening's entertainment." Columnist Walter R. Greene cited the contributions of the entire cast but singled out Bessie Love for special praise: "Bessie Love, in her two appearances, forecast that she is starring material for film musical comedies. She can sing and dance, and in addition has a wealth of vivaciousness and personality that ideally fits the requirements of a musical comedy lead."

The studio's gamble on the no-story format paid off in most situations, although one Texas exhibitor was candid in his assessment: "The highest-priced talker we've played, and nearly the biggest flop. Don't get me wrong, to me it's real entertainment, but out here they kick if they don't get a story." Hollywood Revue inspired a succession of imitations as other studios mounted their own revues. Warner Bros.' The Show of Shows satirized the MGM revue in places. Paramount presented Paramount on Parade and Universal offered King of Jazz. (Fox's Fox Movietone Follies of 1929 came out before Hollywood Revue but abandoned its revue format, ultimately emerging as a backstage story with musical numbers; RKO's Radio Revels of 1929 went astray during the planning stages, and wound up as a Wheeler and Woolsey musical comedy, The Cuckoos).

The Hollywood Revue of 1929 went on to make a profit of $1.1 million (about $21.5 million today) and was considered for the Academy Award for Best Picture. (Note: There were no official nominations at that point in Motion Picture Association of America history.) Producer Rapf tried to follow it up with another revue, The Hollywood Revue of 1930, which was changed during production to The March of Time, and finally abandoned. Musical numbers already shot for the film were edited into M-G-M short subjects of the early 1930s.

== Alternate version ==
Some sources list the original running time of Hollywood Revue of 1929 as 130 minutes. At least two sequences in the original roadshow version are missing from current, 118-minute prints: an opening recitation by the showgirls who are seen posing in the "Hollywood Revue" sign after the opening credits, and the appearance of Nils Asther, who assisted Jack Benny in introducing the final "Orange Blossom" number.

== Preservation ==
The 118-minute version survives with its three original Technicolor sequences. It was released on LaserDisc in the 1990s from MGM/UA Home Video, and on DVD in 2009 through the Warner Archive Collection.

== See also ==
- List of early color feature films
- List of early sound feature films (1926–1929)
- Lionel Barrymore filmography
- The Show of Shows, a similar all-star revue put out by Warner Brothers in 1929
