= Serge Youriévitch =

French sculptor

- Сергей Юрьевич
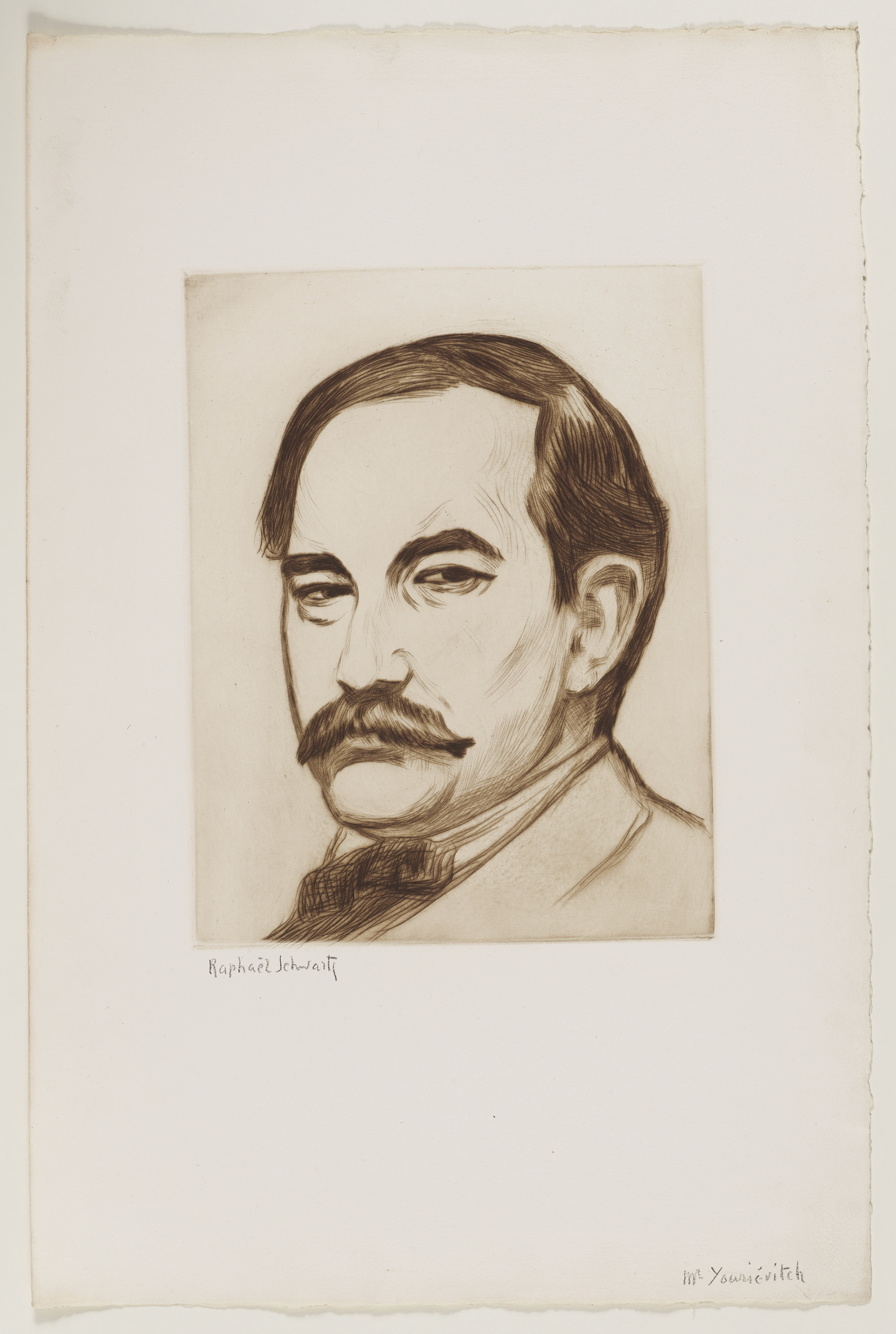
- Print by Raphaël Schwartz
- Born: 31 March 1876; Paris, France
- Died: 18 December 1969 (aged 93)
- Resting place: Sainte-Geneviève-des-Bois Russian Cemetery
- Occupations: Statesman, artist
- Spouse: Princess Helene (née de Lipovatz)
- Children: 2, including Princess Nika Yourievitch
- Relatives: Sir Edward George Warris Hulton (son-in-law)
- Awards: Officer of the Legion of Honour

Prince Serge Youriévitch (Russian: Сергей Александрович Юрьевич, 31 March 1876 - 18 December 1969) was a French sculptor of noble Russian birth, a statesman, writer, and one-time chamberlain to Emperor Nicholas II of Russia. The Brooklyn Daily Eagle described Youriévitch as a "Gentleman Farmer in Russia, Scientist in France, Diplomat in Russian Imperial Foreign Service, Painter, Etcher and Sculptor."

== Family ==
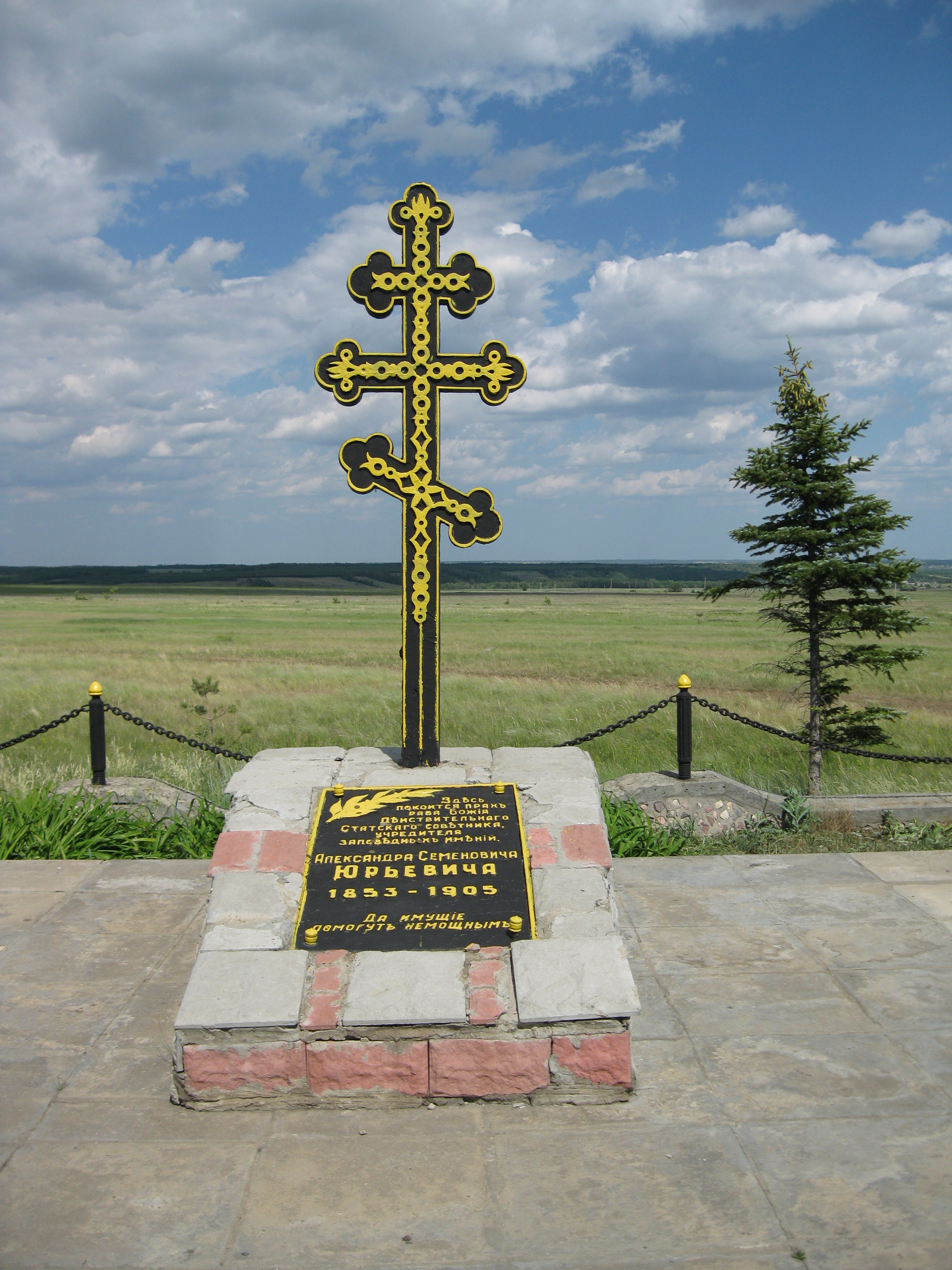
Crypt of Youriévitch's father in Lopukhovka, Saratov, Russia, where the family was once landed gentry

Serge Youriévitch was born in 1876 in the 8th arrondissement of Paris, into a family of petty Belarusian nobility. His Russian name was Sergei Alexandrovich Yurievich, which was translated into French as Serge Youriévitch.

His parents were Alexander Semyonovich Yurievich and Yelizaveta Andreyevna Yurievich. He had two older brothers, Simon (born 1870) and Alexander (born 1871). His grandfather, Semyon Yurievich (1798—1865), came from a noble family in Mogilyov (supposedly descended from Ivan the Terrible), in present-day Belarus. In 1825, he was appointed as a tutor to tsarevich Alexander Nikolaevich, the future Emperor Alexander II, for which he was later made a Knight of the Order of the White Eagle.

Youriévitch married Princess Helene Lipovatz, daughter of Prince Jovan Popović-Lipovac, a Montenegrin aristocrat and Russian Imperial Army general. General Popović-Lipovac led the 48th Division in the Russian Civil War, where he was wounded. Helene was a cousin of Princess Elena Petrović-Njegoš of Montenegro.

Serge and Helene had two daughters. The first was Princess Helen Youriévitch, named after her mother. Their second daughter was Princess Nika Yourievitch, born 2 August 1916. Princess Nika married Sir Edward George Warris Hulton, son of Sir Edward Hulton, 1st Baronet. Together Princess Nika and Sir Hulton had three children, named Edward Alexander Sergius Hulton, Cosmo Philip Paul Hulton and Elizabeth Frances Helen Hulton.

In 1917, the Yurievich family lost their land in the Saratov Region after the downfall of Nicholas II and the monarchy. Youriévitch had returned to Saratov when he heard Russia was "going to pieces", but he was unable to save the property. His wife was almost killed during the overthrow.

His family's vast art collection is now at the Saratov State Art Museum.

== Politics ==
Youriévitch began studying politics at the Imperial Alexander Lyceum in Saint Petersburg. No person was admitted whose family's noble rank was conferred upon them before 1600. Youriévitch stated, however, that he was more interested in science than in politics. In 1895 he was sent to the École Libre des Sciences Politique, where he acted as secretary to the Russian Ambassador in Paris, then as cultural attache.

Youriévitch acted as Councilor of State in Saint Petersburg. His most notable political position, however, was that of chamberlain to Nicholas II, the last emperor of Russia.

== Sculpture ==
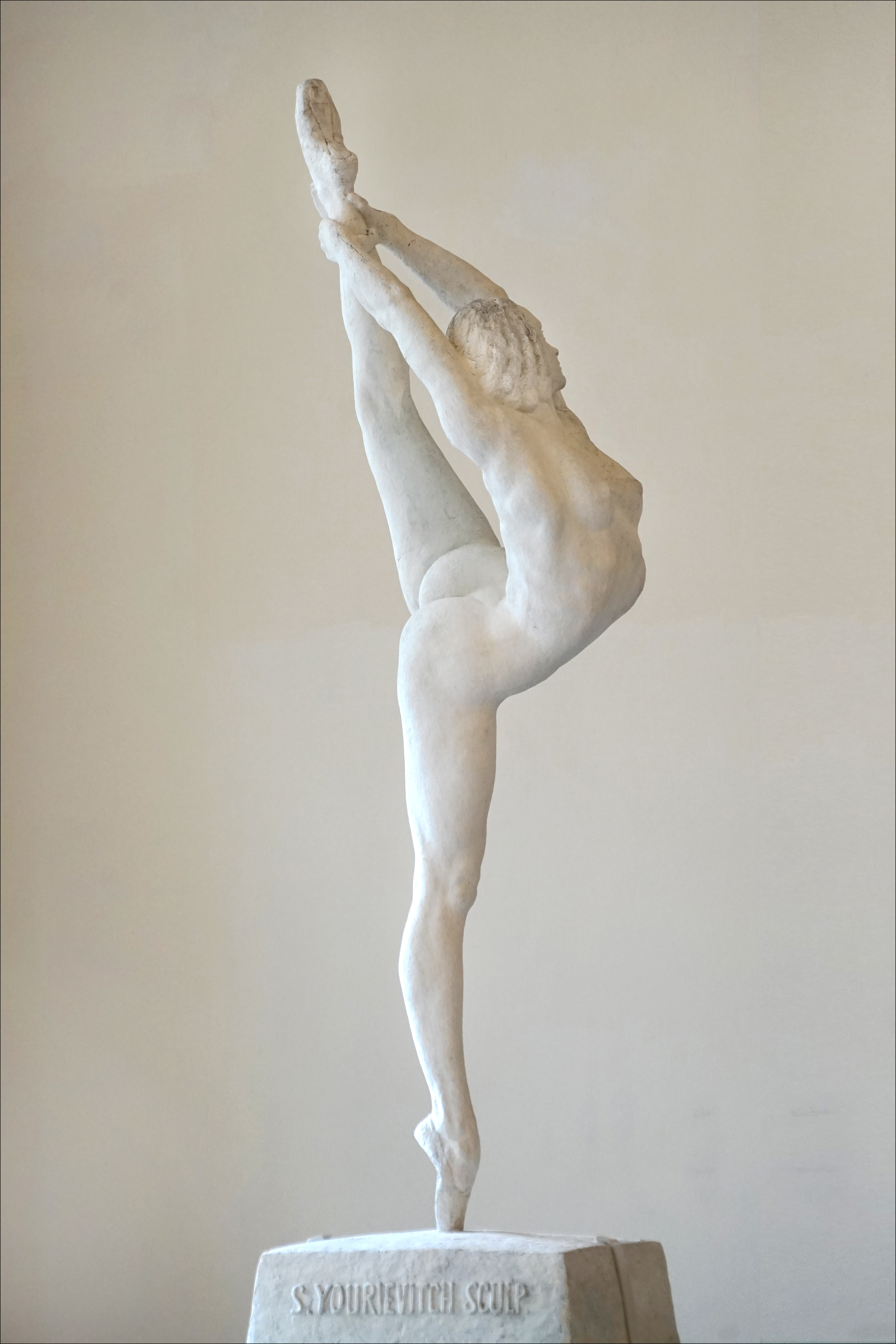
fr:Sacha Lyo by Youriévitch Paris, Petit Palais.

In 1903, Youriévitch met sculptor Auguste Rodin, with whom he began studying. Rodin was "enormous" with his influence, and in 1909, Youriévitch resigned his political duties and began exhibiting his work at the Salon des Indépendants in Paris.

Youriévitch described his entry into sculpting, "I had little or nothing to do with art until my health broke down in 1903. I had been doing all the organizing and secretarial work of the Institut and the strain was too heavy. I went to Switzerland and began to paint as a relaxation. I worked in oil, water color, pastel and etching and made some success at exhibitions. I got a studio in Rome. And one day while I was trying to master the anatomy of a foot for a painting, I decided to make it, first in clay. The impression I received on having the thing round and solid in my hand instead of flat on a canvas was so strong that I wondered why I had done no sculpture before. I immediately took up sculpture, and on coming back to Paris I got a studio in the Hotel Biron upstairs over Rodin." His work was also part of the sculpture event in the art competition at the 1924 Summer Olympics.

Youriévitch became an accomplished sculptor himself, mostly focusing on garden and fountain pieces. He also worked on busts of famous people of the day, including nobility. In 1928, he presented Katharine Stewart-Murray, Duchess of Atholl with a bust of herself for her Silver Wedding celebration to John Stewart-Murray, 8th Duke of Atholl. The bronze bust was said to bear a "strong resemblance to the subject."

In 1929, Youriévith made an Iroquois head, today preserved to the musée du nouveau monde of La Rochelle (France). In 1930, he realised a bust of Franklin D. Roosevelt, then Governor of New York. While Roosevelt was in his presidency, Princess Lipovatz traveled to the White House to present Roosevelt with the bust. She ended up staying with the First Family for two days. Another bust created by Youriévitch was of Thomas Hardy, the English novelist and poet. Youriévitch also contributed to British art, including sporting art and modern sculpture.

Youriévitch taught sculpture at the Guildford School of Art in the 1950s, where Lorne McKean (b. 1939) took classes under him.

One of his sculptures called Morning Dew was put on auction at Christie's in 2007. It was estimated to be worth $40,000-$60,000, with the realized price at $60,000. The sculpture was bronze with green patina.

== Notable works ==
As well as sculpting, Youriévitch was also a painter and sketcher. Some of his pieces include:

- La divine danseuse Nattova (1923)
- First nations female (1920–1929)
- Portrait d'homme barbu (1926)
- Portrait de femme au fond bleu (1929)
- Indien Iroquois (1929–1930)
- Morning dew (1929)
- Portrait de Sa'ad Zaghlul (1926)
- Iroquois head (1929-1930)
- Buste de Franklin D Roosevelt (1930)
- Buste de femme aux seins nus
- Tête de Pierrot
- Paysage de neige
- Thomas Hardy (1924)
- Femme nue assise
- Jeune femme à genoux (1931)
- Symphonie humaine (1920)
- Polin (1922)
- Femme et enfants
- Le printemps

== Additional interests ==
Youriévitch was vice president of the Institut Général Psychologique in Paris and wrote some psychological papers, including Concerning some Manifestations of Psychic Entities. He was a donor of the Institut Psychologique International, founded in 1900. In 1930, the American Society for Psychical Research stated that "Youriévitch enjoyed for many years an intimate acquaintance with the leading scientists and psychic researchers of Paris and was able to take part in many of their experiments." He was also a member of the Sociological Society in Paris.

Youriévitch once dined with Empress Zauditu, though he was not allowed to look upon her face, as custom required. Two slaves held thick veils around the empress so that Youriévitch could not see her, though he sat next to her through the meal.

== Personal life ==
In 1913, Youriévitch was made an Officer of the Legion of Honour by the French government. In 1933, he was granted French citizenship.

Princess Lipovatz died on 16 May 1957. Youriévitch died 12 years later in 1969, at age 93. He and his family, including his son-in-law Sir Edward Hulton, were buried in the Sainte-Geneviève-des-Bois Russian Cemetery in Île-de-France north of Paris.
