= Adagio (acrobatics) =

Acrobatics technique

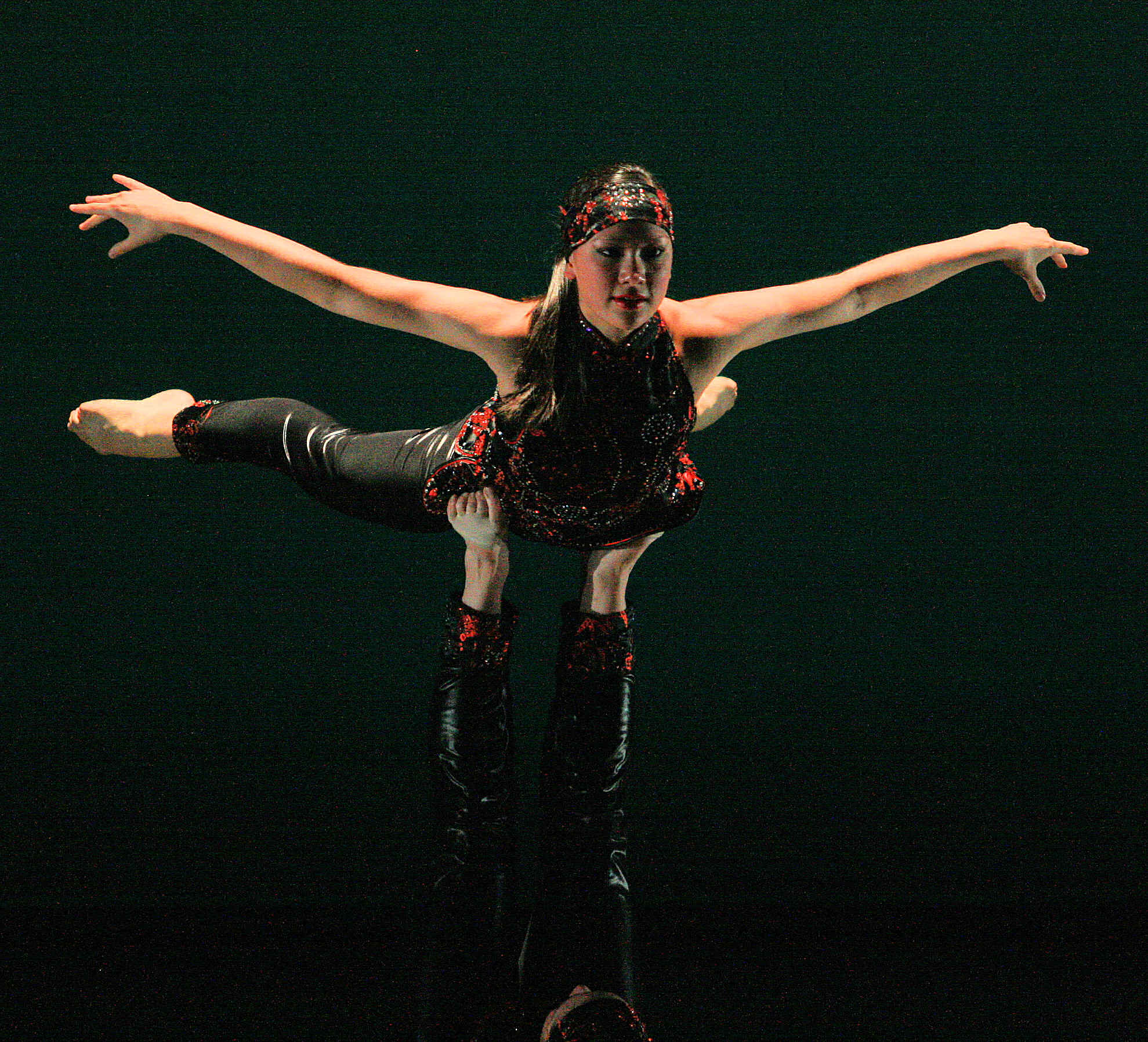
Adagio swan, performed by an acro dance duo

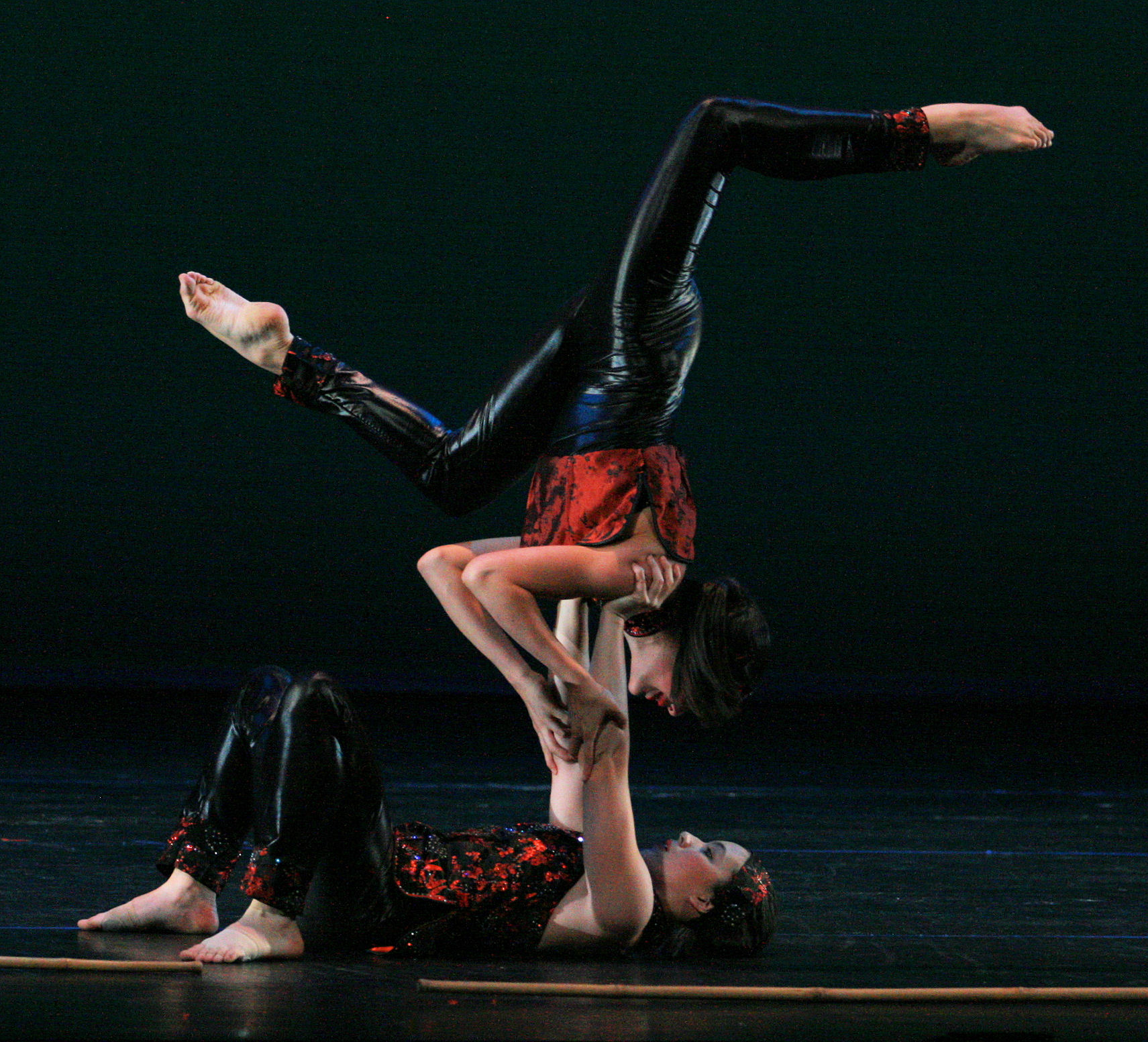
Adagio stag shoulder stand

Adagio is the performance of partner acrobalance poses and associated movements that involve stationary balances by a pair of performers. It is performed in professional circus, in various dance disciplines including acro dance and ballet, in pair skating, and as a hobby in university circus groups.

An adagio pair consists of one person acting as a flier and another as a base. The base remains in contact with the floor and the flier is balanced in the air. The base may move between a variety of positions including lying on the floor, crouching, standing and kneeling. The flier may be balanced on the base's feet, hands, shoulders, knees, thighs, back or combinations of these, in a variety of positions and orientations including horizontal, vertical or even upside down. In general, it is easier for the flier to be lighter and the base heavier and stronger, though this is not a requirement as equal partner weights or even an imbalance of weights in the other direction can be leveraged.

== See also ==
- Acrobatic gymnastics
- Acrobatics
