= Count de Salis-Soglio =

Continental title of nobility

Count de Salis-Soglio is a continental title of nobility that was recognized in the United Kingdom for a Swiss family which became British Subjects when Jerome, 2nd Count de Salis, was naturalized by a private act of Parliament, De Salis's Naturalization Act 1730 (4 Geo. 2. c. 5 Pr.) in 1731.

Francis I, Holy Roman Emperor, by a patent dated Vienna, 12 March 1748, had created his father, colonel and ambassador Peter de Salis, together with his descendants, Counts of the Holy Roman Empire.

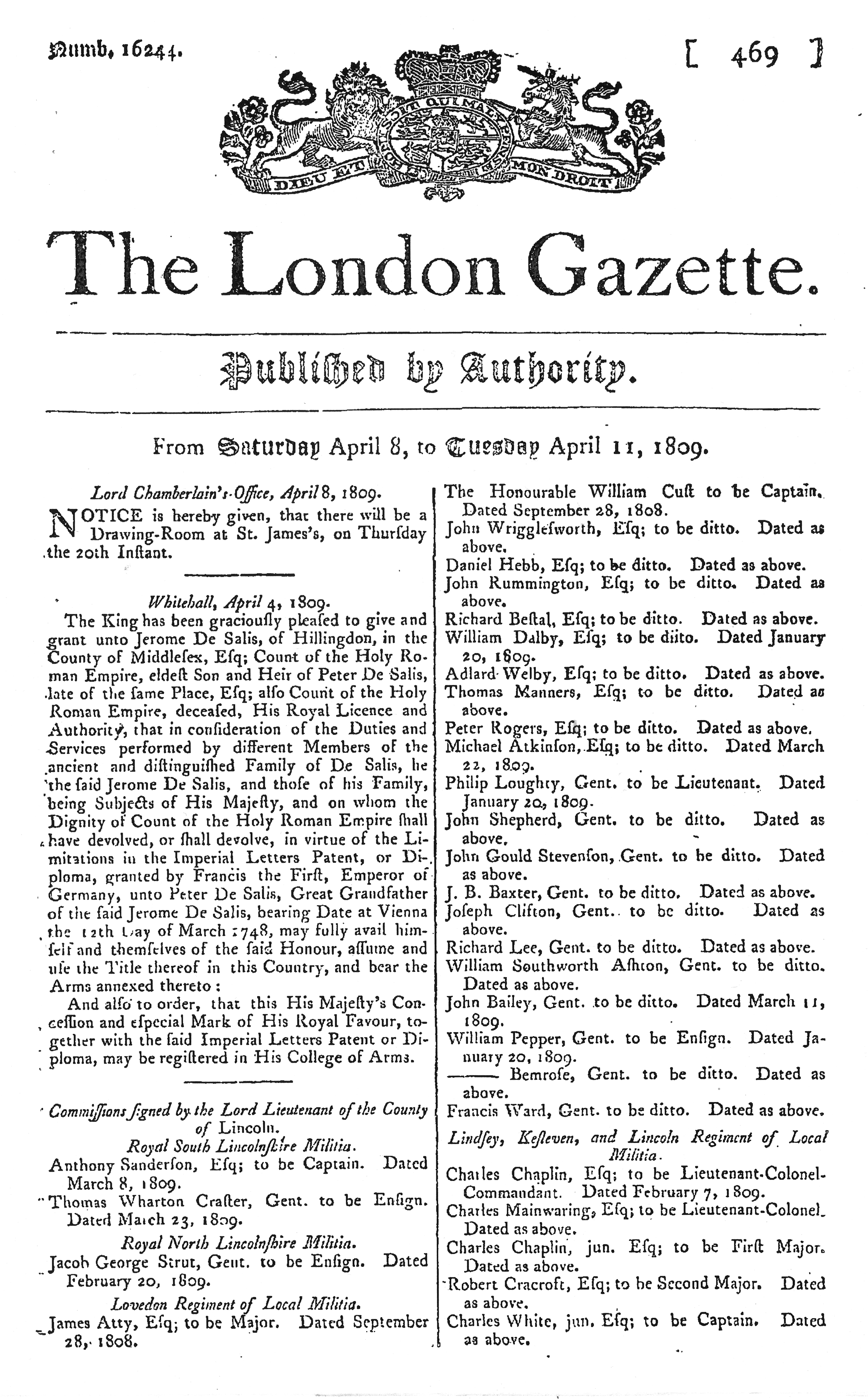
London Gazette, April 8 to April 11, 1809, announces grant of Royal Licence to Jerome De Salis, and his descendants, to assume & use title of Count in UK.

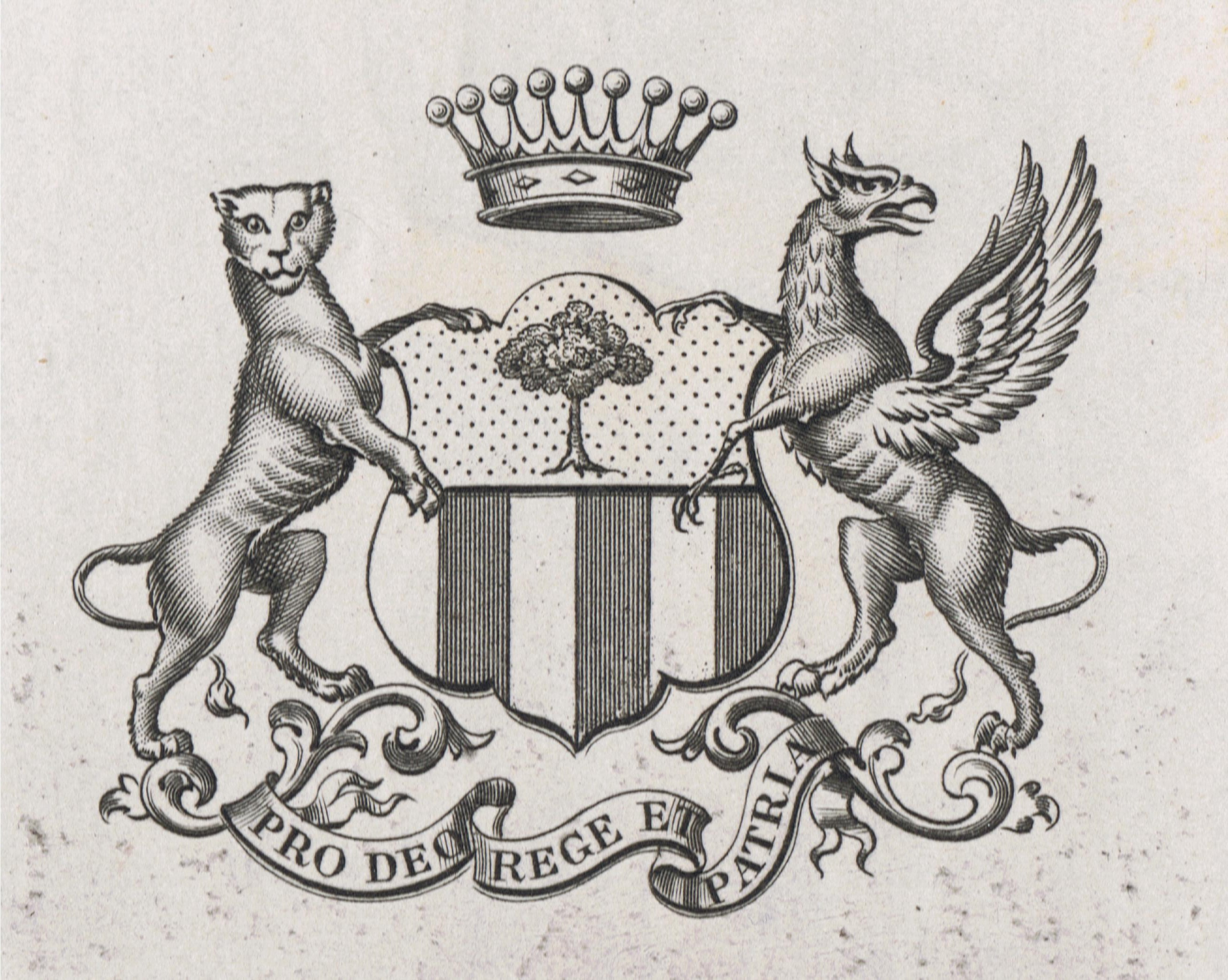
Comital arms of De Salis.

On 4 April 1809 George III, by royal licence, granted and gave Jerome, 4th Count de Salis's descendants, of both sexes, those who were Subjects of Our Realm, the right to fully avail themselves of the title of Count of the Holy Roman Empire. The right to use the name of Fane before that of de Salis was granted, by Royal Licence and Authority as published in the London Gazette, on 11 December 1835. In the same April 1809 licence the same Jerome de Salis-Soglio was granted assumption and use of the arms of Count, with the arms, crest and supporters of de Salis, with the quarterings of Fane, Neville, Beauchamp, and Le Despenser. The de Salis are thus the oldest royal licence holders granted the Authority or Warrant to use their foreign titles in the United Kingdom; by 1930/1932 only 13 families of British Subjects were still using such hereditary authority.

== Family history ==
The de Salis family belongs to the old nobility of the Three Leagues (nowadays the Canton of the Grisons, Switzerland). They were one of its leading families between the 16th and 18th centuries and provided numerous presidents of the League of God's House. A notable member was the poet Johann Gaudenz von Salis-Seewis of the branch of the Counts de Salis-Seewis.

They probably descend from the patrician family Salici of Como, Italy, traceable since 1202. The name Salice means Salix caprea (the family coat of arms contains a salix – or goat willow – tree, along with the crest of the Bellona). At first the family appears in Soglio, Switzerland with ser Rodolfus de Salice de Solio between 1285 and 1293. In the 12th and 13th centuries, wealthy citizens of Como had settled in the area north of Lake Como due to the conflicts between the expanding Milan and the municipality of Como. Soglio is located at the beginning of the Val Bregaglia (Bergell valley) which at the time belonged to the Prince-Bishopric of Chur, and is presently situated on the border between Switzerland and Italy. The family became vassals of the bishop and built several tower houses in Soglio and the neighbouring Chiavenna. When the latter was sold by Chur to the Visconti of Milan in 1335, the Salis became their vassals as well. The Visconti dukes granted them trading privileges from 1391, which they kept until 1544. The tower houses in both communities were later converted into baroque palaces (there are 5 in Soglio alone, of which the Casa Battista, also known as Hotel Palazzo Salis, built in 1630 on an older structure, is still today owned by the Swiss Salis-Soglio line). So is the Palazzo Salis in Bondo, Switzerland, just across from Soglio on the other side of the valley, which was built by Jerome, 2nd Count de Salis, and which to this day is owned by the British Salis-Soglio branch.

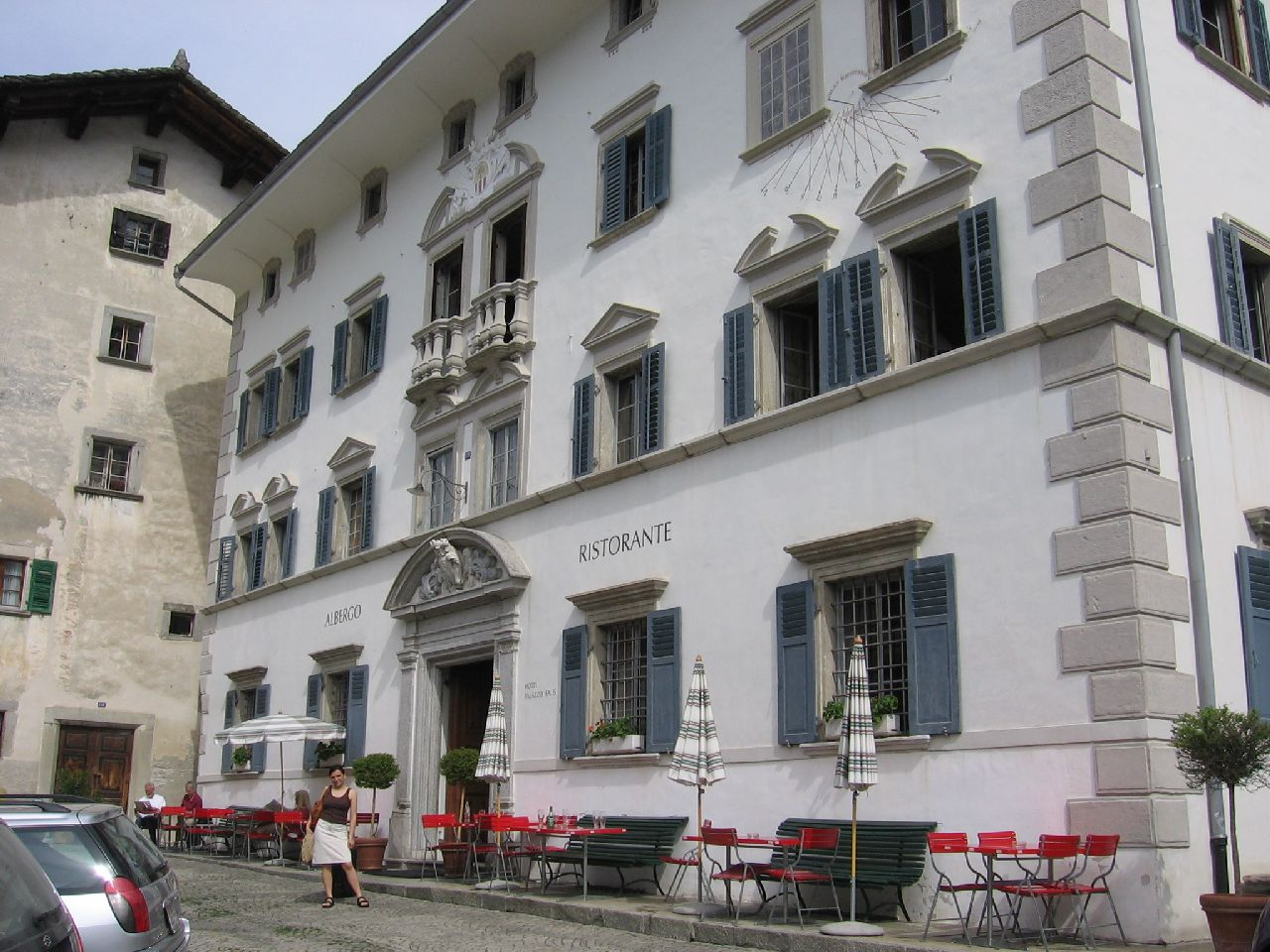
Soglio: Cas' Alta (left) and Casa Battista (Hotel Palazzo Salis, built in 1630, right), still owned by the Swiss family branch

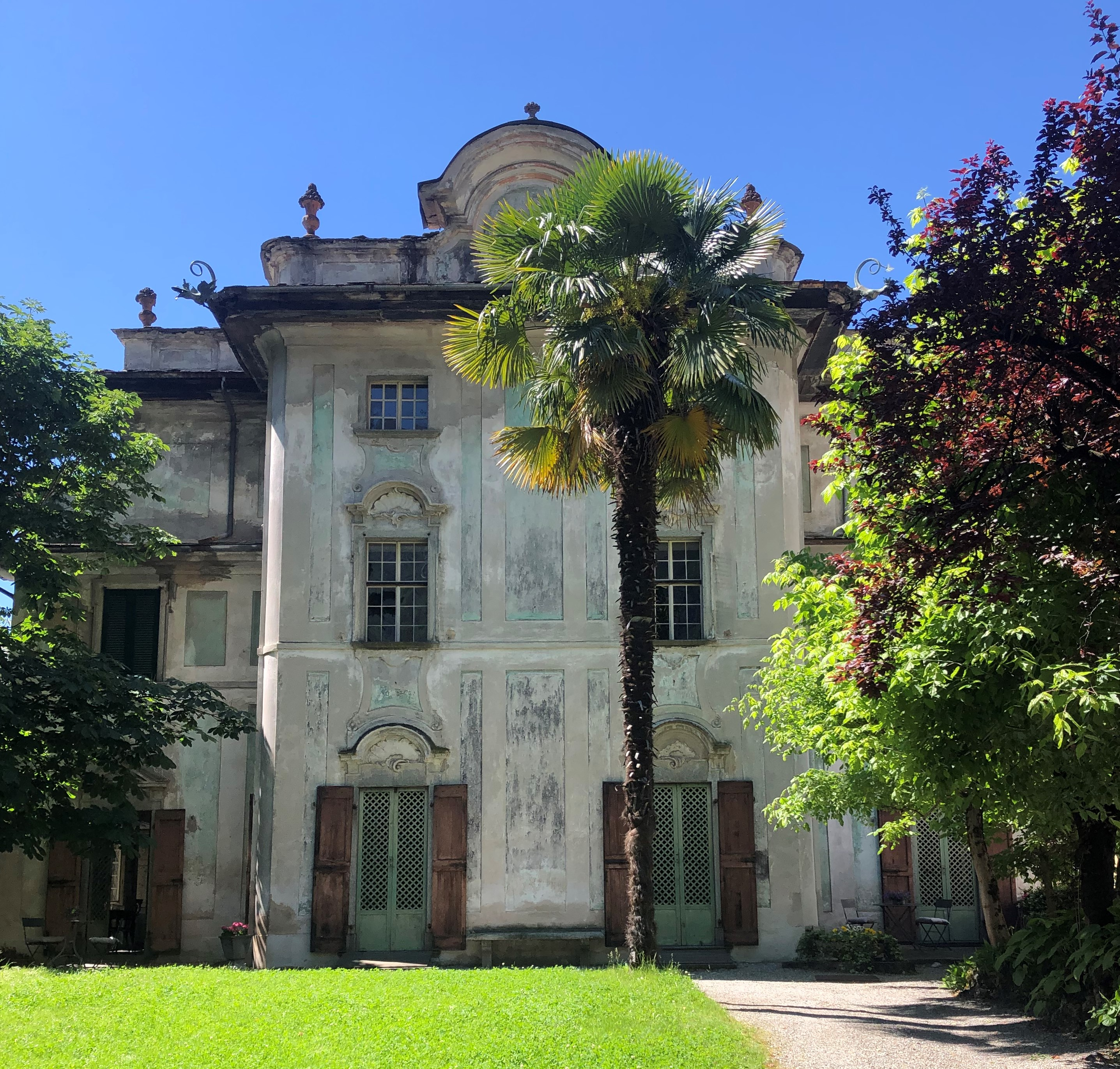
Palazzo Salis, Chiavenna

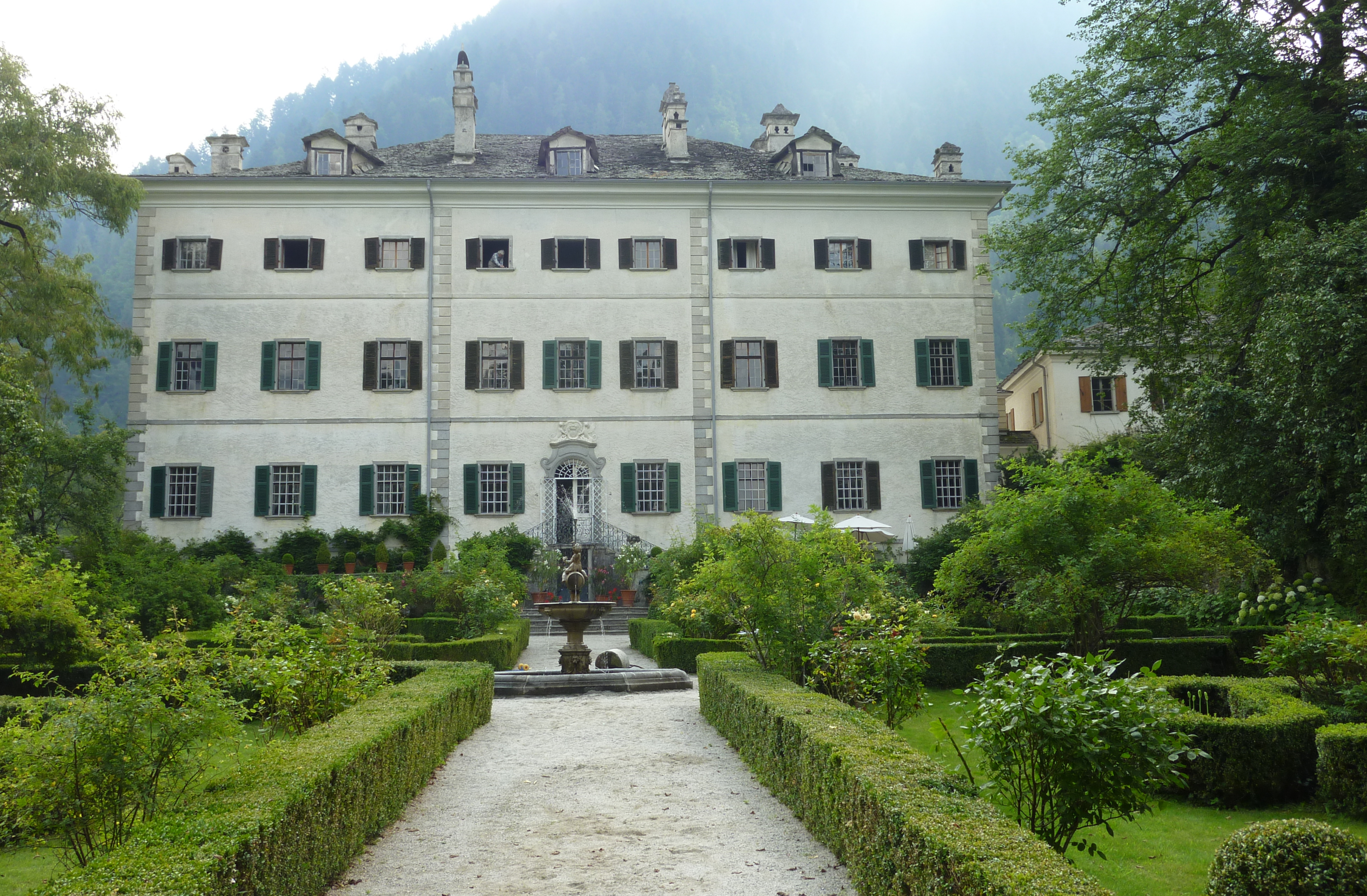
Palazzo Salis in Bondo, 1766–1776 built by Jerome, 2nd Count de Salis, and still today owned by the British family branch

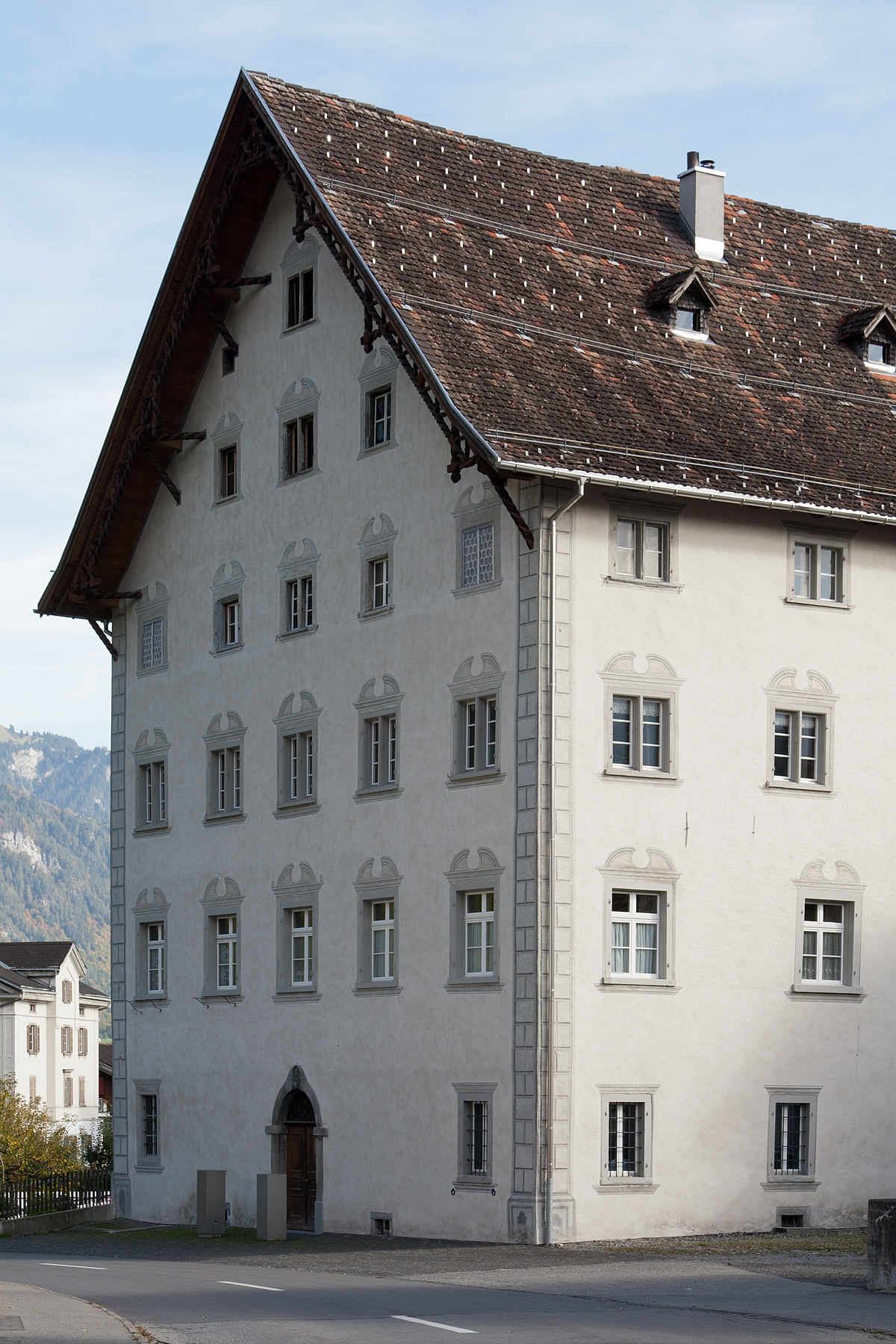
The manor house at Grüsch, built by Hercules von Salis-Soglio in 1590

The family gradually expanded their property northwards beyond the Val Bregaglia into the Upper Engadin (Celerina, Samedan, Zernez) and Prättigau valleys, and later also into Domleschg valley. The heyday of the family began in the 16th century, after the establishment of the Free State of the Three Leagues which ended the Prince-bishop's power in 1524.

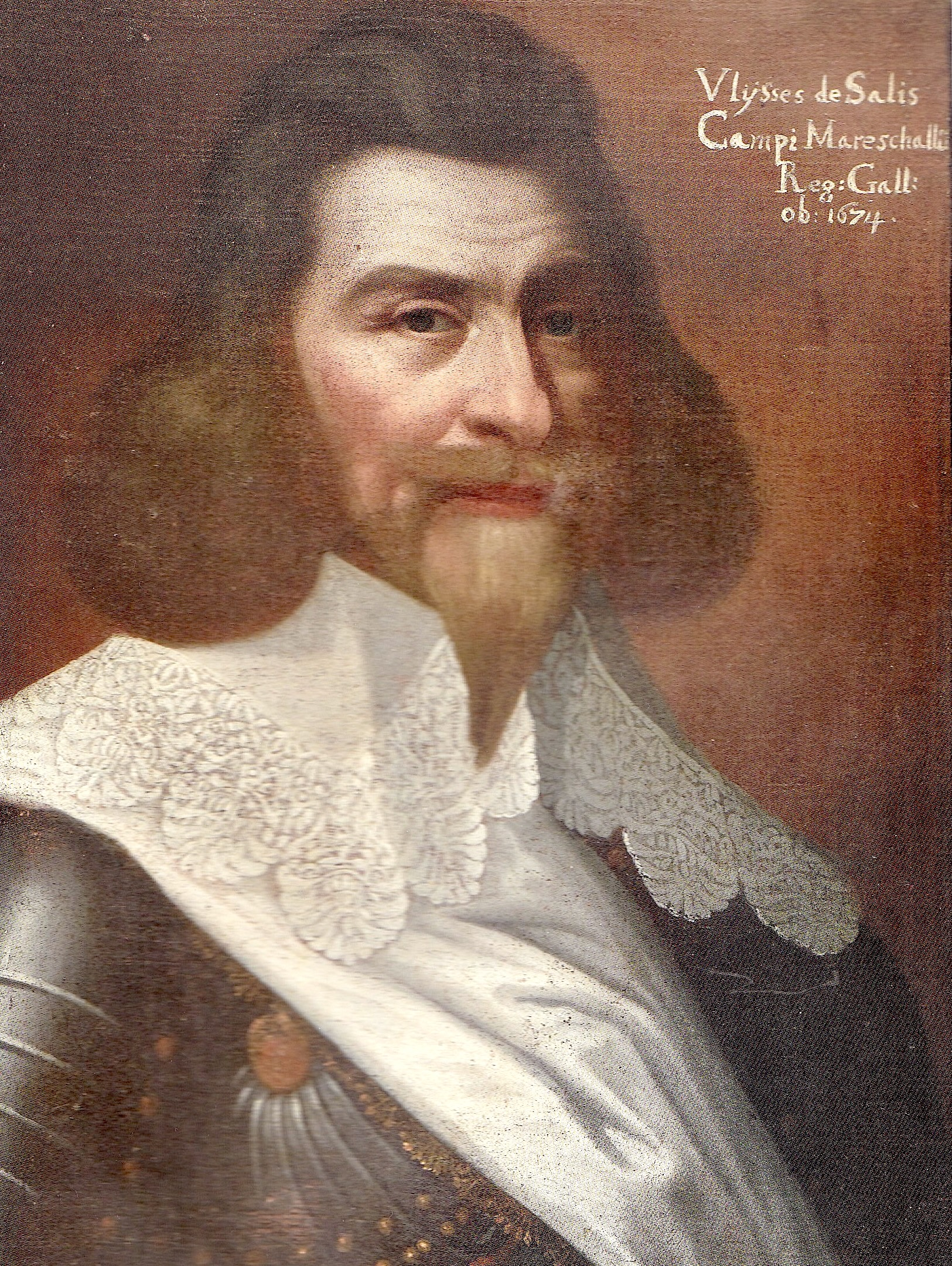
Ulysses von Salis (1594–1674), French Maréchal de camp

During the Bündner Wirren (Revolt of the Leagues between 1618 and 1639), several members of the Salis family, such as Hercules von Salis-Soglio-Grüsch (1566–1620), a propagator of reformed Protestantism, and his son Ulysses von Salis (1594–1674), stepped on the French-Venetian side, being mercenary leaders who guarded the Alpine passes, and thus gained considerable influence on the country's fortunes, whereas their main rivals, the mostly Roman Catholic von Planta family, led the Austrian-Spanish side. The rivalry culminated with the assassination of Pompeius Planta in 1621 in a castle that he shared with the Salis-Grüsch. During the 17th and 18th centuries, the family became the predominant noble house of the Three Leagues, after ousting the Plantas. Ulysses acquired Marschlins Castle and restored it to its still preserved glory. Among many other estates and manor houses, Haldenstein Castle (1703 until 1922), and the Upper and Lower manors at Zizers were built or owned by the family. Bothmar Castle at Malans, Switzerland, is the current seat of the Counts de Salis-Seewis. A German branch, the Barons von Salis-Soglio, inherited Gemünden Castle in 1822, and still own it.

The family's political power was not broken until the Helvetic Republic put an end to the Three League's sovereignty in 1798. Franz Simon von Salis-Zizers, commander of the 7th French Guards Regiment of the Bourbons and in 1809 President of the League of God's House carried out a coup in 1814. In 1832 he led Pope Gregory XVI two Swiss regiments to assert the Papal State. General Johann Ulrich von Salis-Soglio was commander-in-chief of the conservative Sonderbund alliance in the Sonderbund War in 1847, while Johann Gaudenz Dietegen Count von Salis-Seewis took part in the Revolutions of 1848 as the radical democratic commander of a militia; in 1850 he was governor in Chur.

Jerome, 2nd Count de Salis (1709–1794), whose father had been ambassador in London, married Lady Mary Fane, a daughter of Charles Fane, 1st Viscount Fane, of the Earls of Westmorland, only to be sent back by King George II as British envoy to the Three Leagues. Ever since, the family has continued to commute between England and Switzerland, being citizens of both countries. A present-day seat is Yarlington House, Somerset, besides Palazzo Salis in Bondo.

== Lineage ==
Family tree of the de Salis family (Brit. Counts de Salis-Soglio on the 4th sheet)

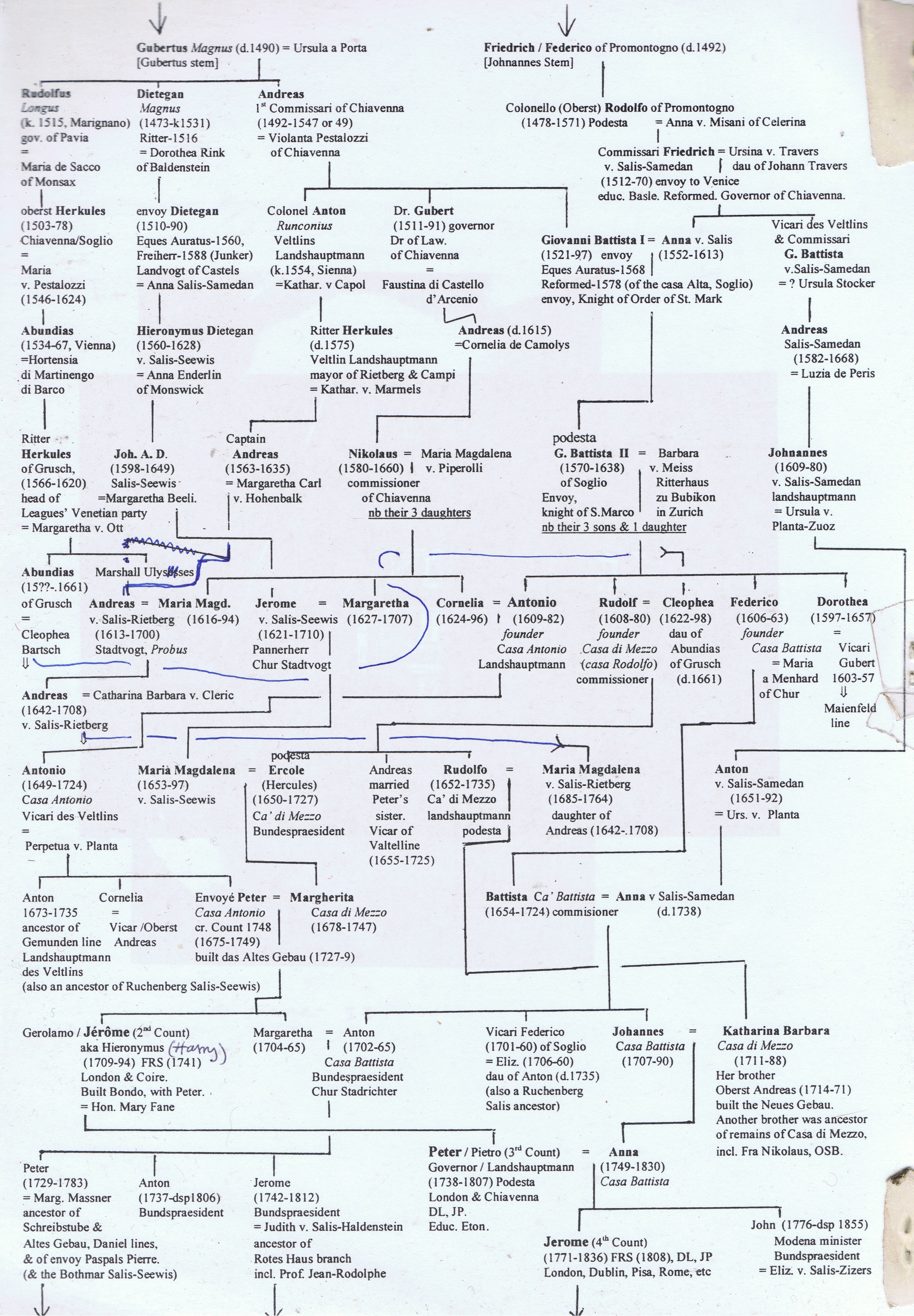
Chart of connections of various Salis houses and the Counts de Salis-Soglio.

1. Peter (Pierre, L'envoyé, or Pietro l'Inviato), 1st Count de Salis, 'Envoy Extraordinary of the Grisons to Her Majesty', arrived Court of St. James's, 12 July 1709;
2. Jerome/Hieronimus, 2nd Count de Salis, Naturalized British Subject by a private act of Parliament, the De Salis's Naturalization Act 1730 (4 Geo. 2. c. 5 Pr.), 24 March 1730/1731, and married, by the Archbishop of York, Hon. Mary Fane, 7 January 1734/35, eldest daughter of Charles, (1st), Viscount Fane;
3. Peter, 3rd Count de Salis, DL, JP, inherited his mother's share of the Bourchier/Fane estates in County Limerick and County Armagh;
4. Jerome, 4th Count de Salis-Soglio, DL, JP;
5. Peter, 5th Count de Salis-Soglio, DL, JP;
6. John Francis William de Salis, 6th Count de Salis-Soglio, diplomat and numismatist;
7. Sir John Francis Charles de Salis, 7th Count de Salis-Soglio, KCMG, CVO.
8. John Eugène de Salis, 8th Count de Salis-Soglio.
9. John Bernard Philip Humbert de Salis, 9th Count de Salis-Soglio, TD.
10. John-Maximilian Henry de Salis, 10th Count de Salis-Soglio.
11. John Arthur Francis Maria de Salis, 11th Count de Salis-Soglio.
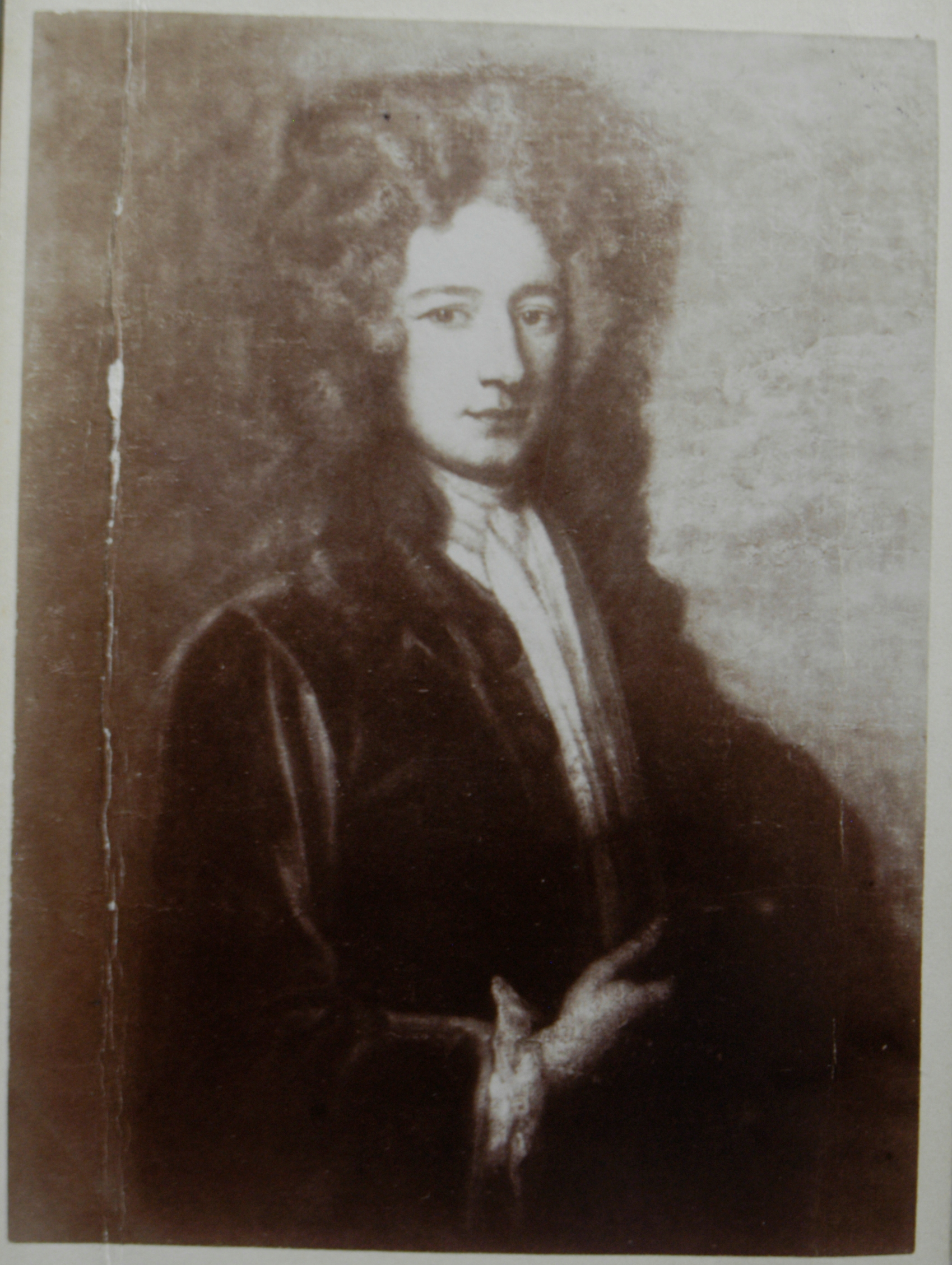
1st Count.

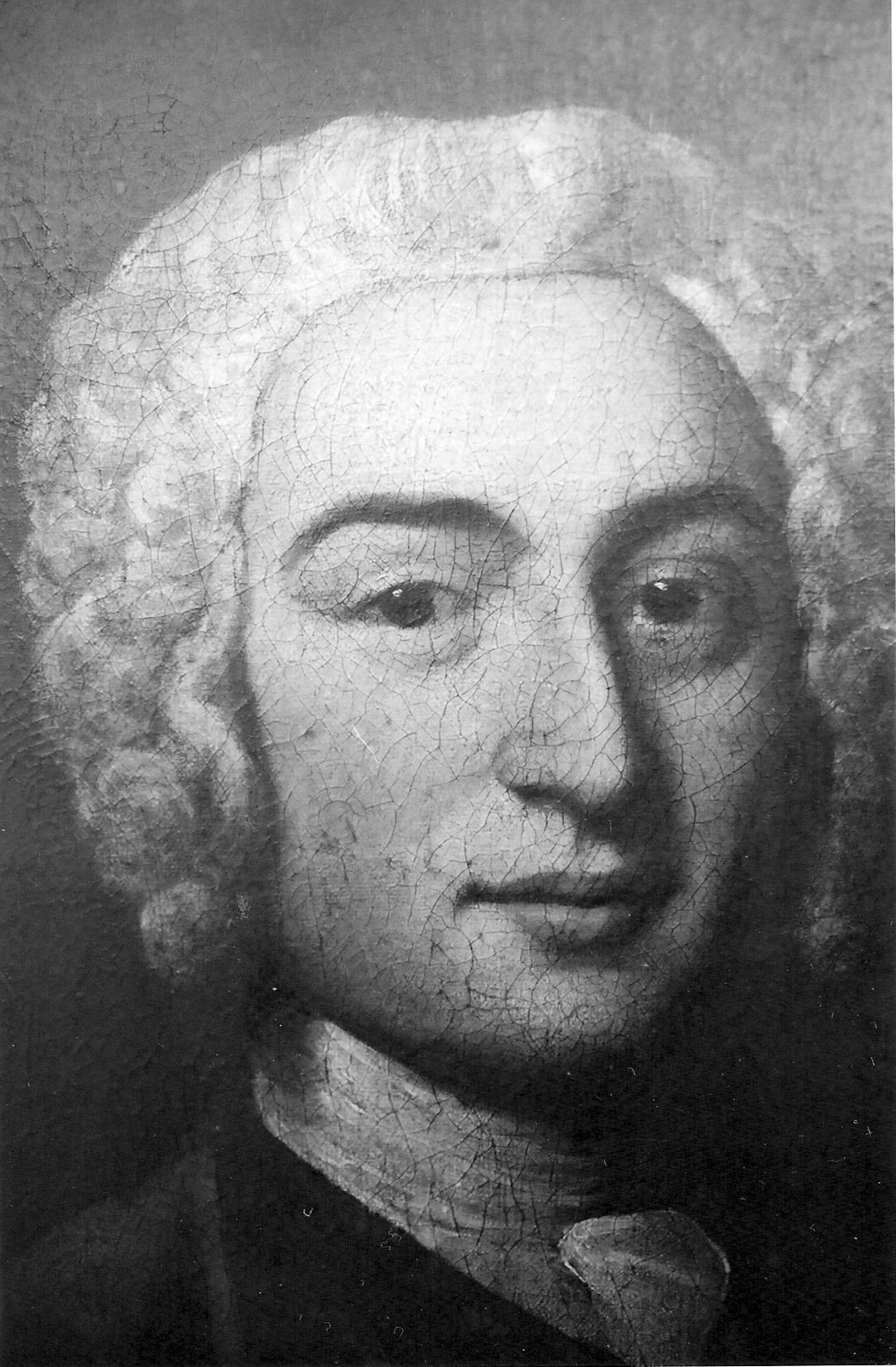
2nd Count.

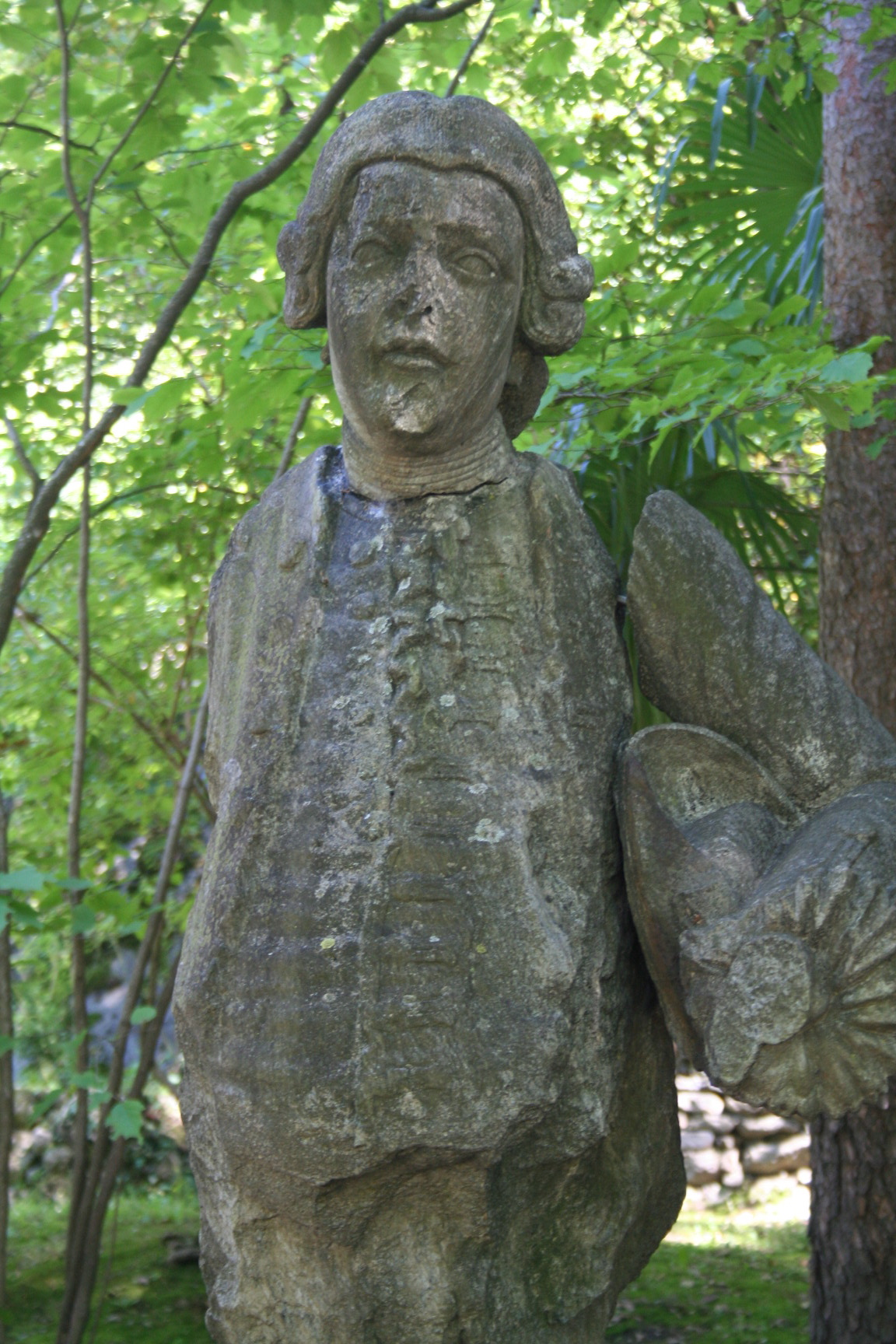
3rd Count.

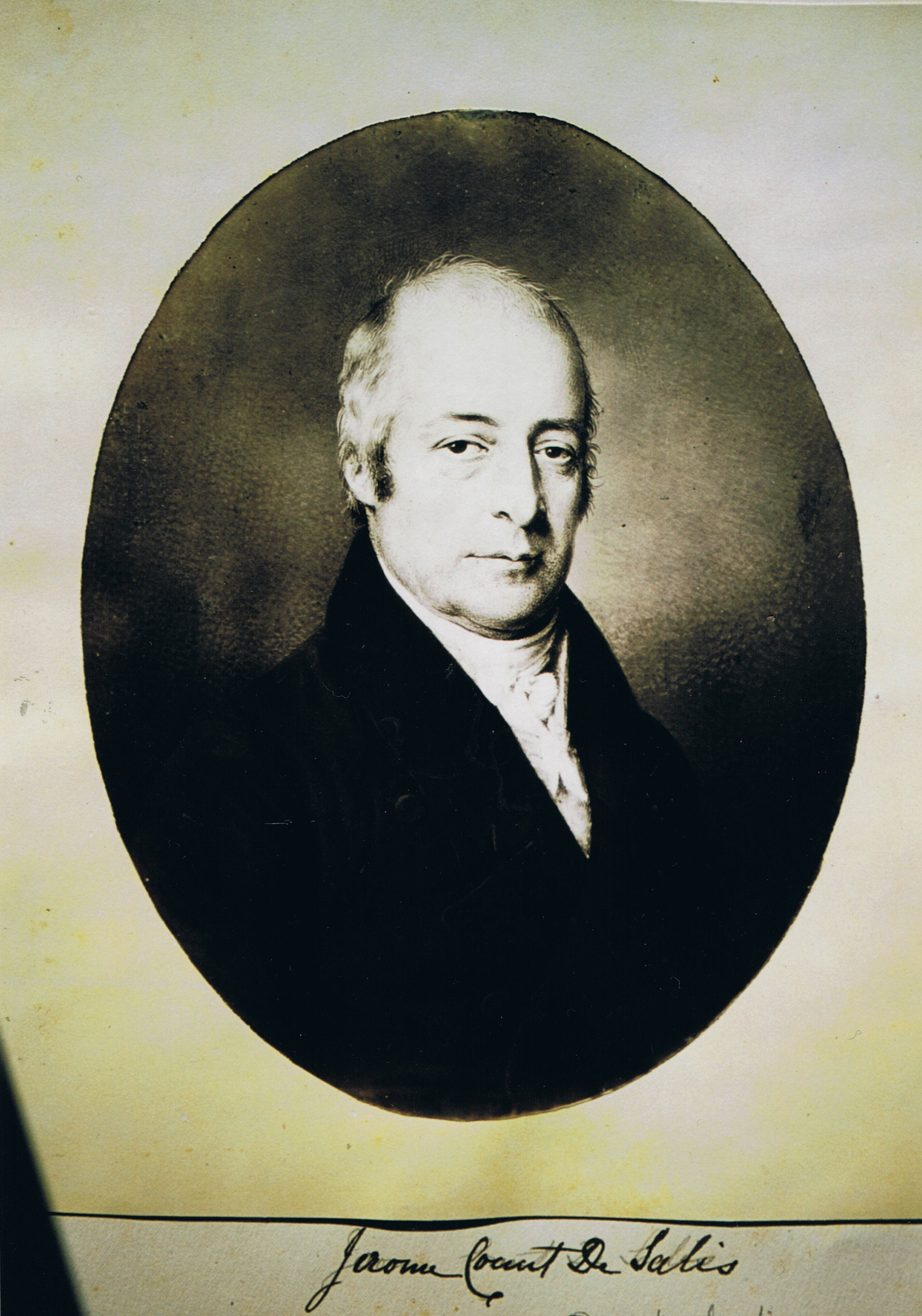
4th Count.

5th Count.

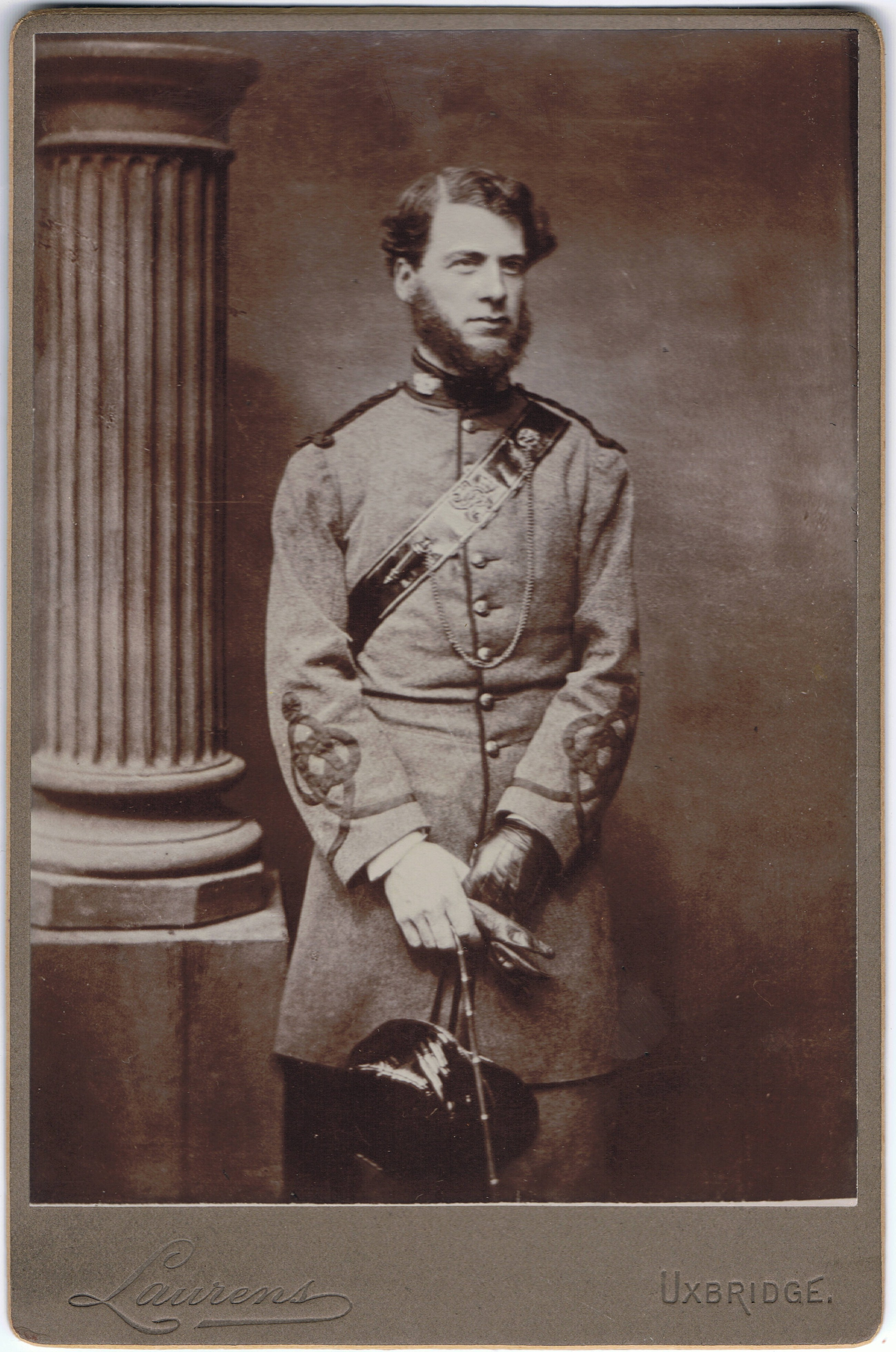
6th Count.

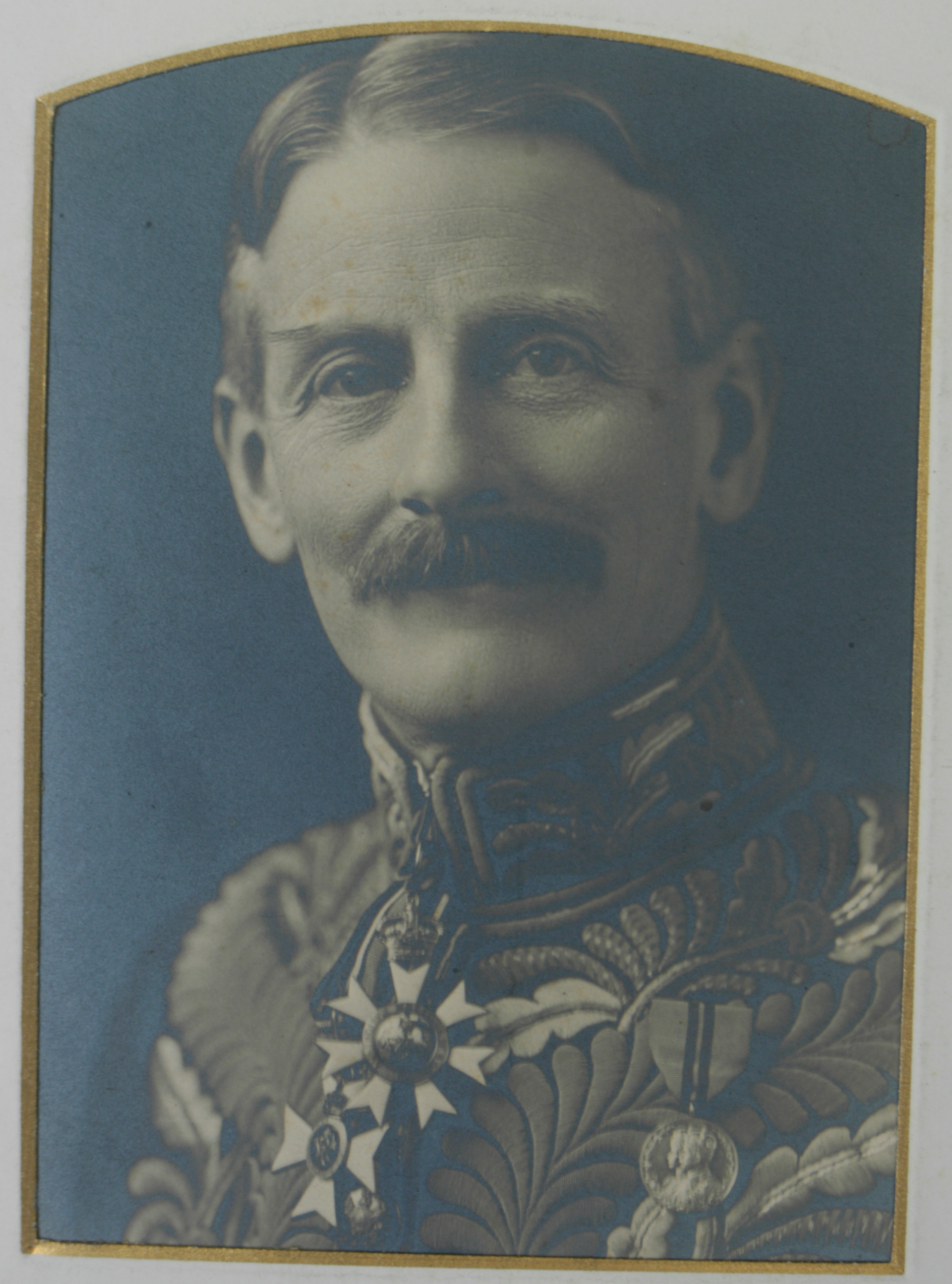
Sir John Francis Charles de Salis, 7th Count de Salis-Soglio, KCMG, CVO

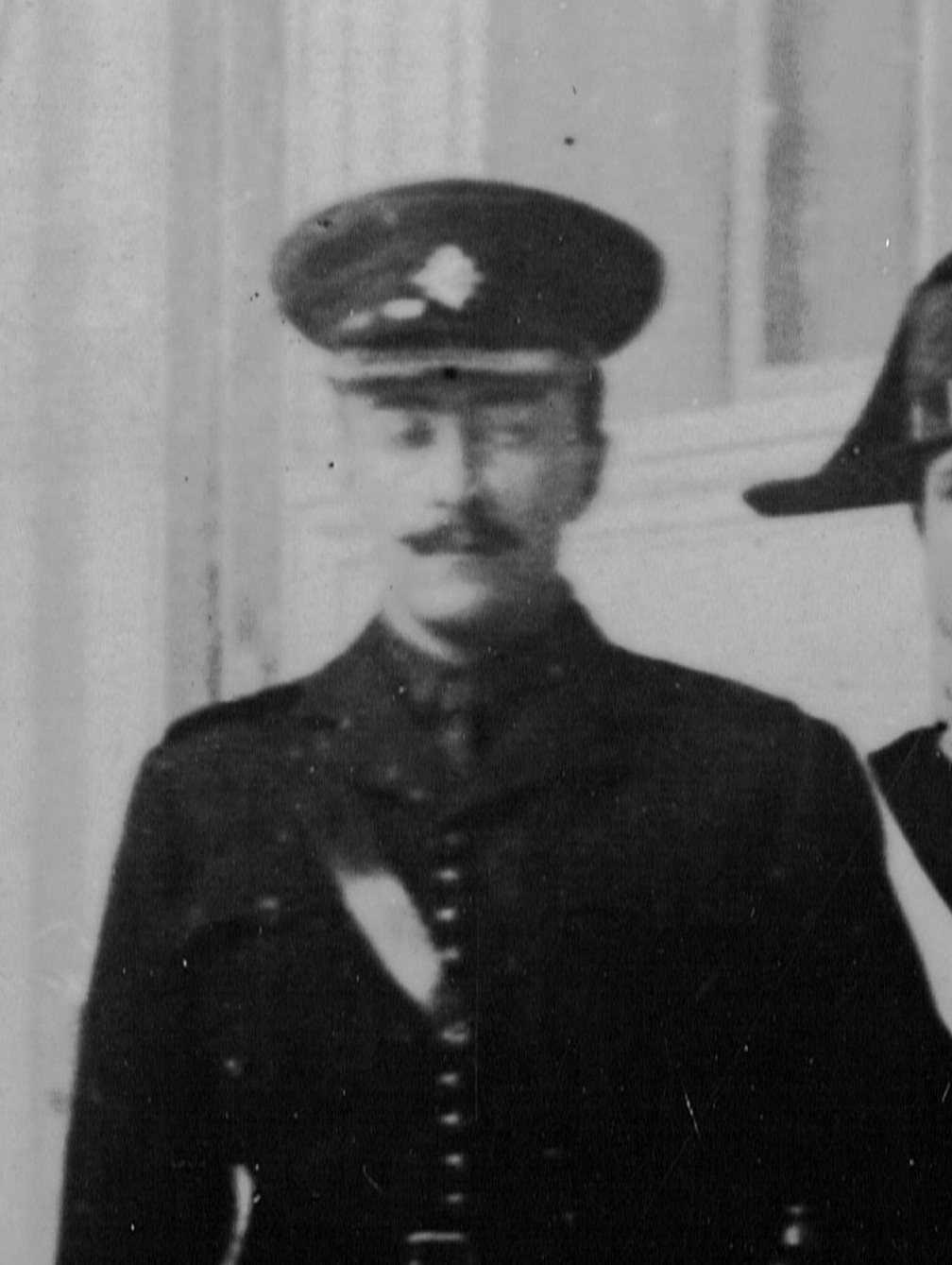
8th Count.

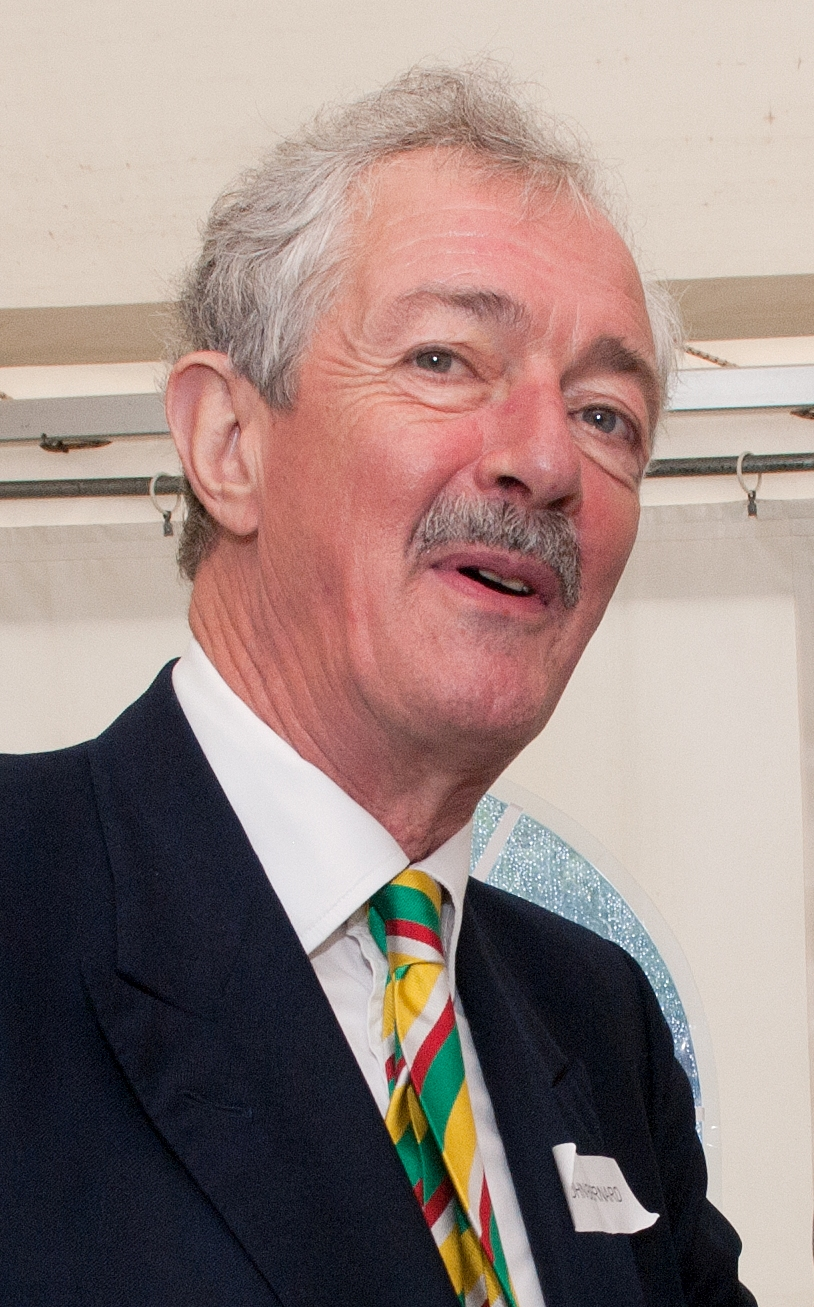
9th Count.

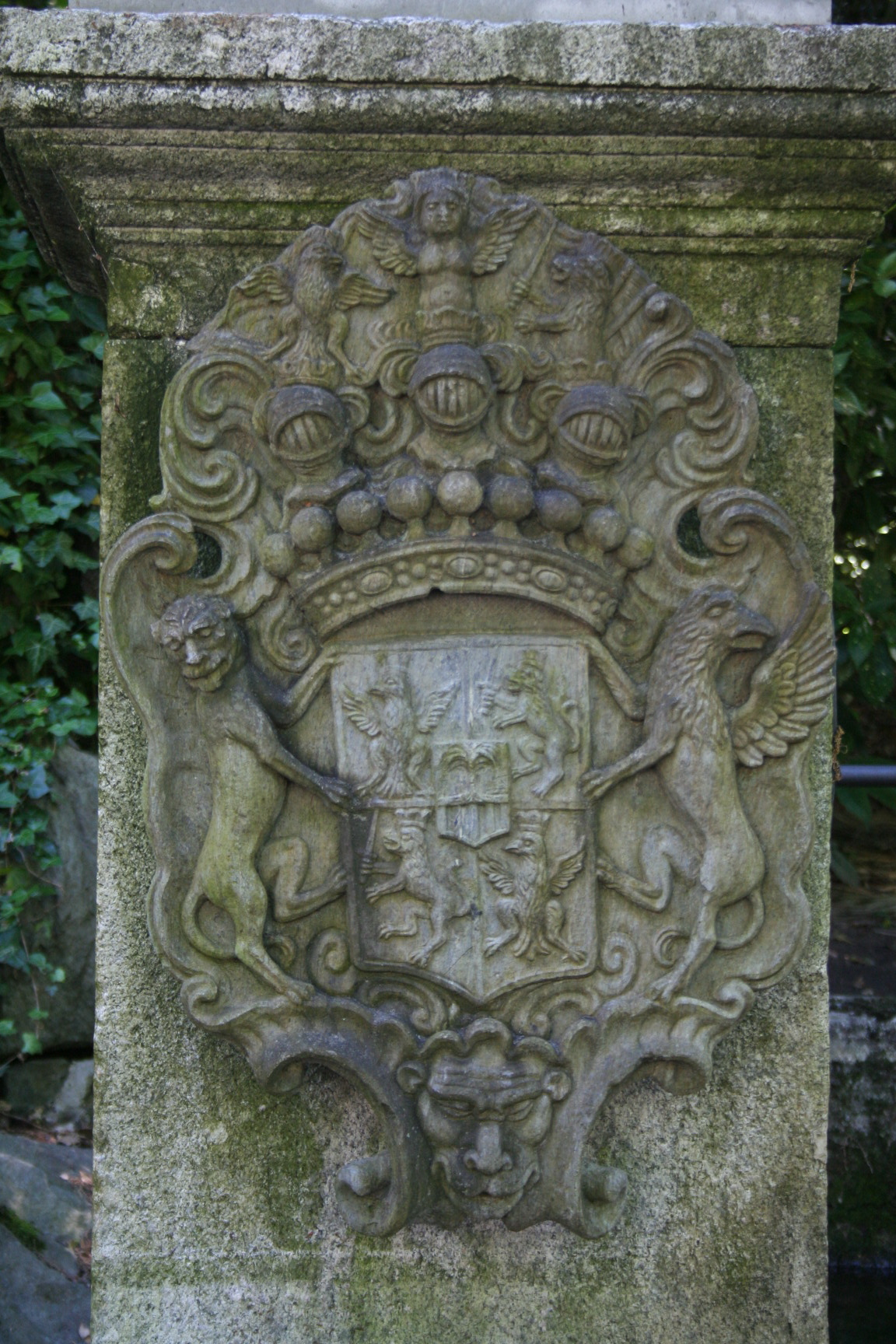
_{Imperial countly arms of Counts de Salis-Soglio as made for the base of a statue to the 3rd Count, Chiavenna, late 18th century.}

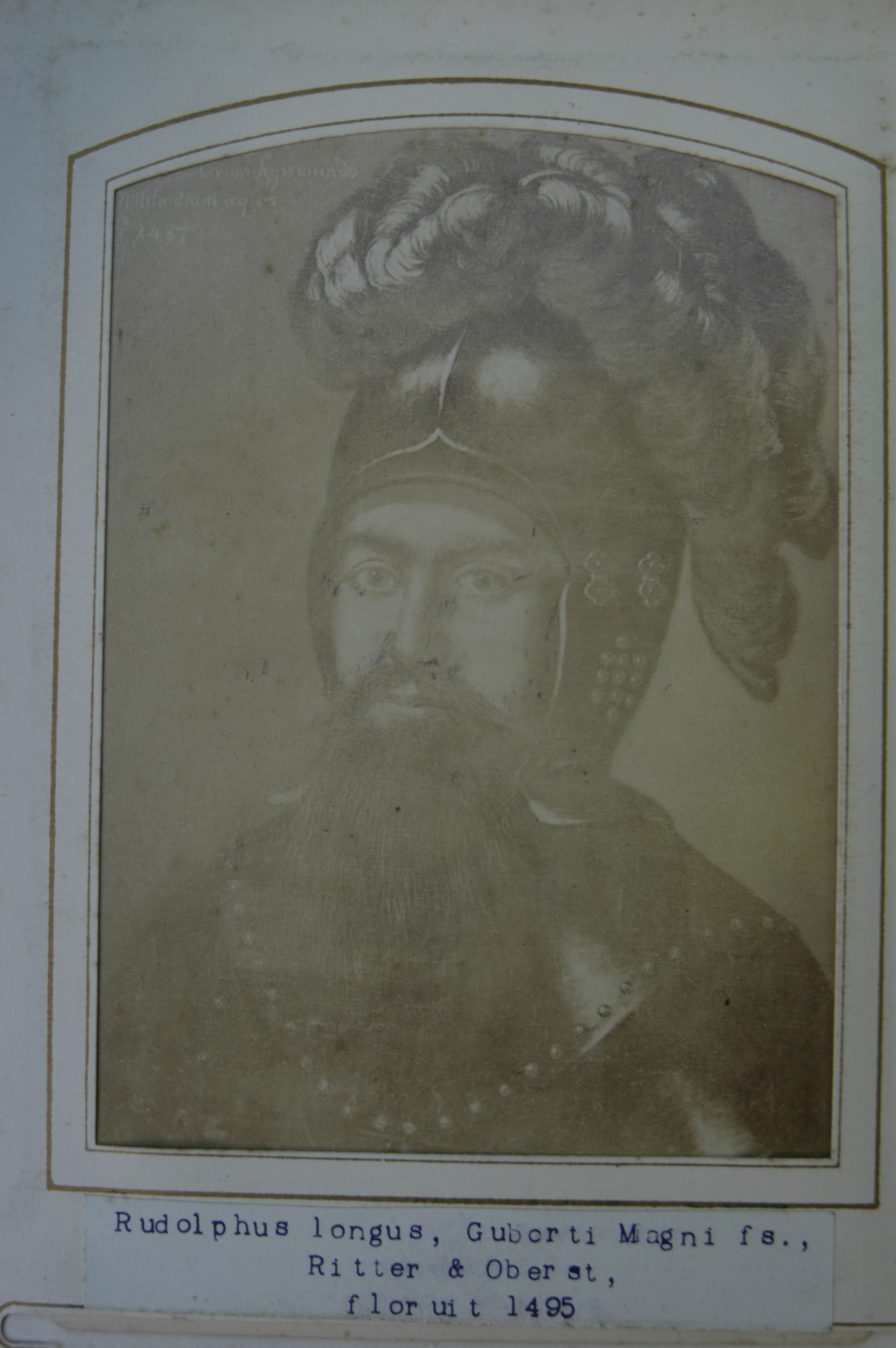
_{Forefather, uncle and leading mercenary fighter: Rudolfus Longus à Salis. Governor of Pavia for the Dukes of Milan, wounded at Novara, 1513, and killed at Marignano, 1515.}

== UK royal licence granted to the 4th Count on 4 April 1809, reiterating in English the 1748 Imperial patent ==
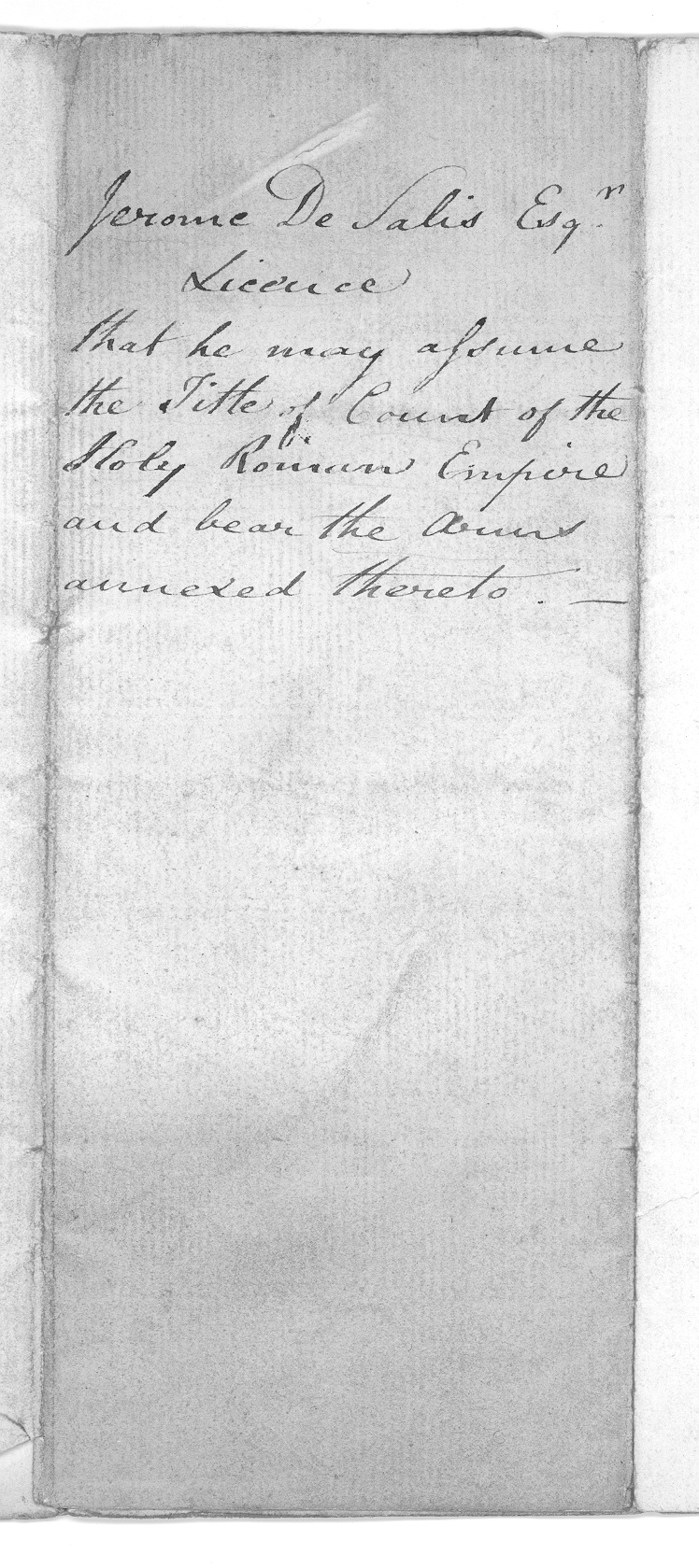
_{Cover of Licence}

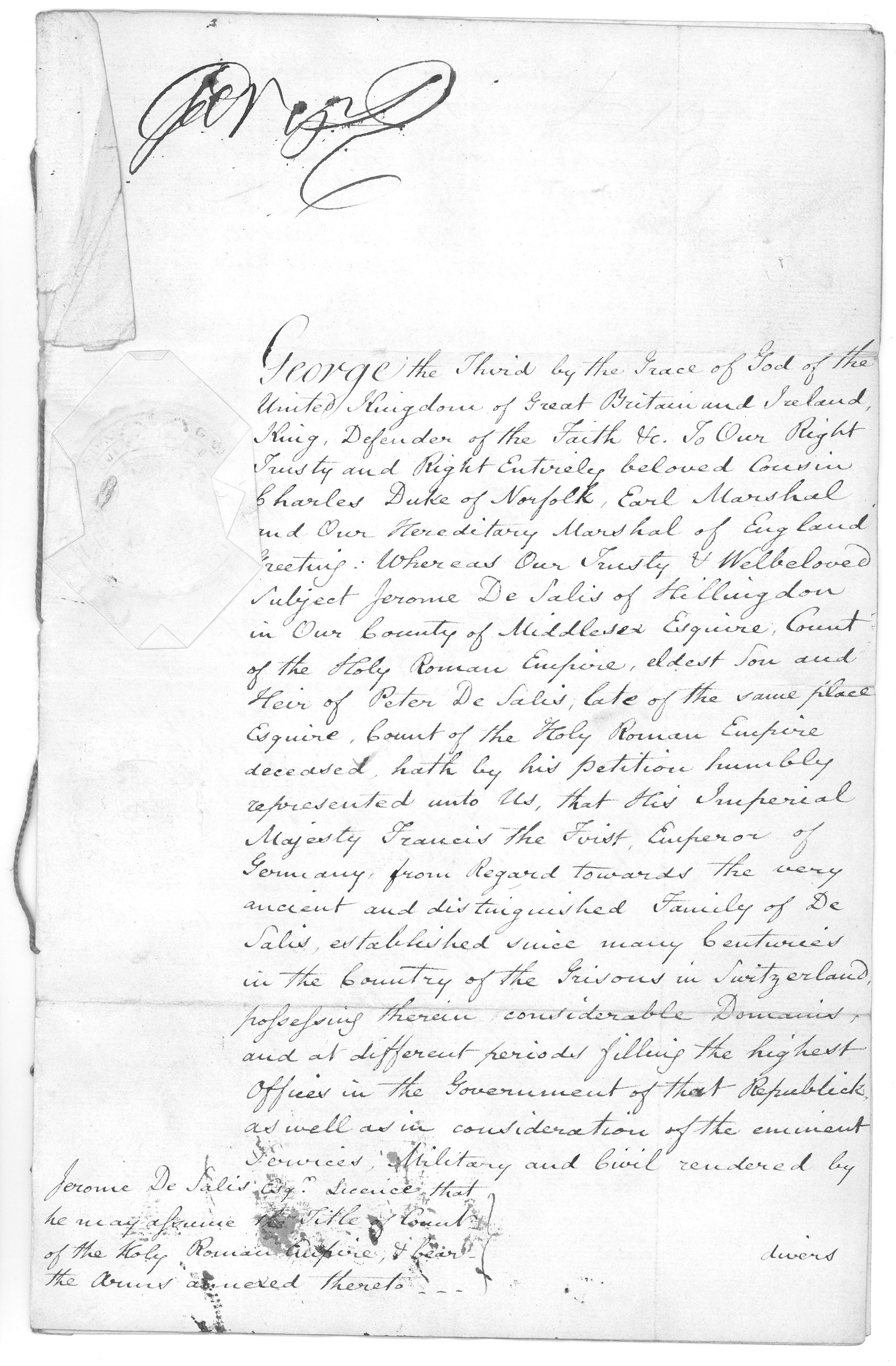
_{Page one of Licence}

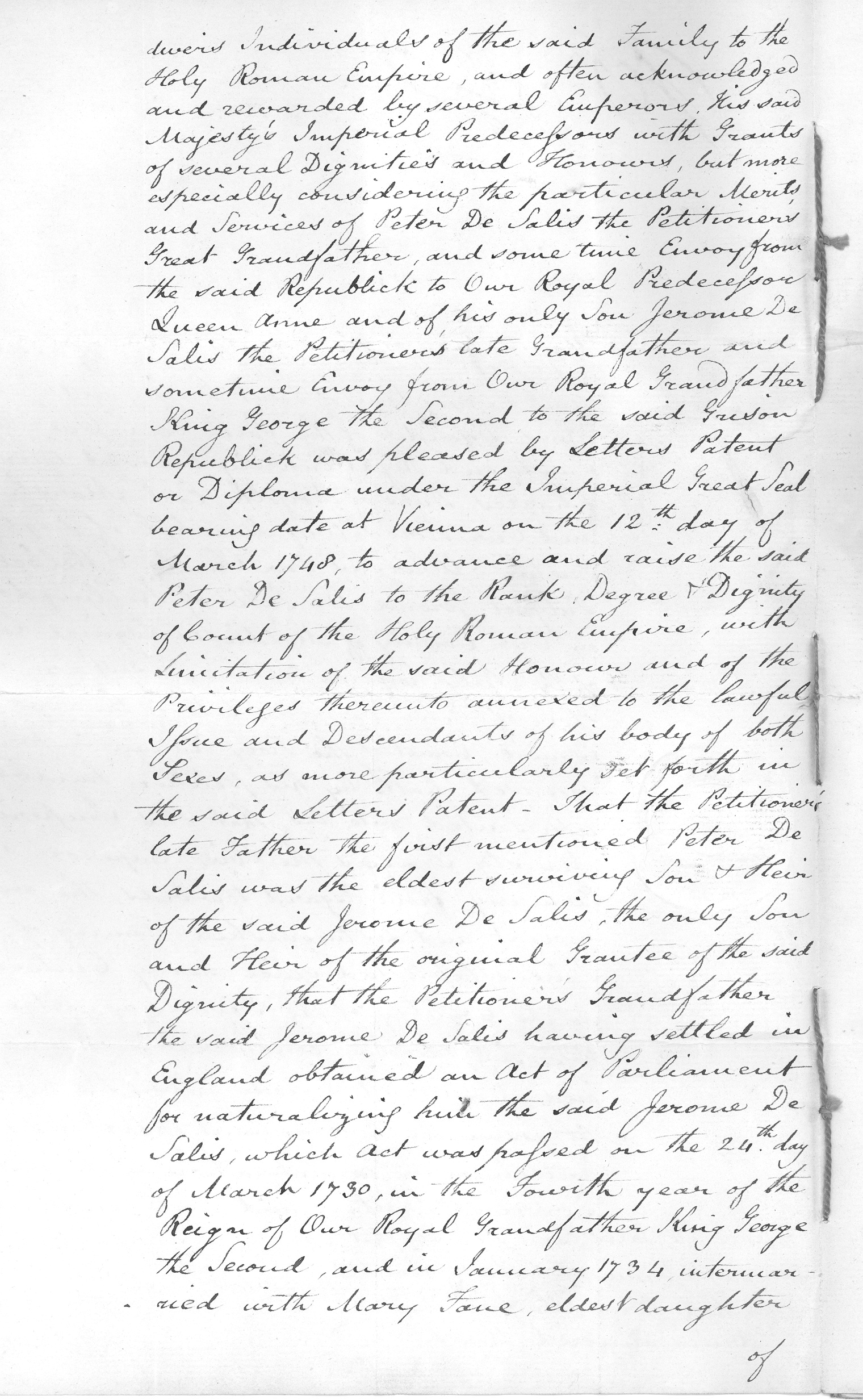
_{Page two of Licence}

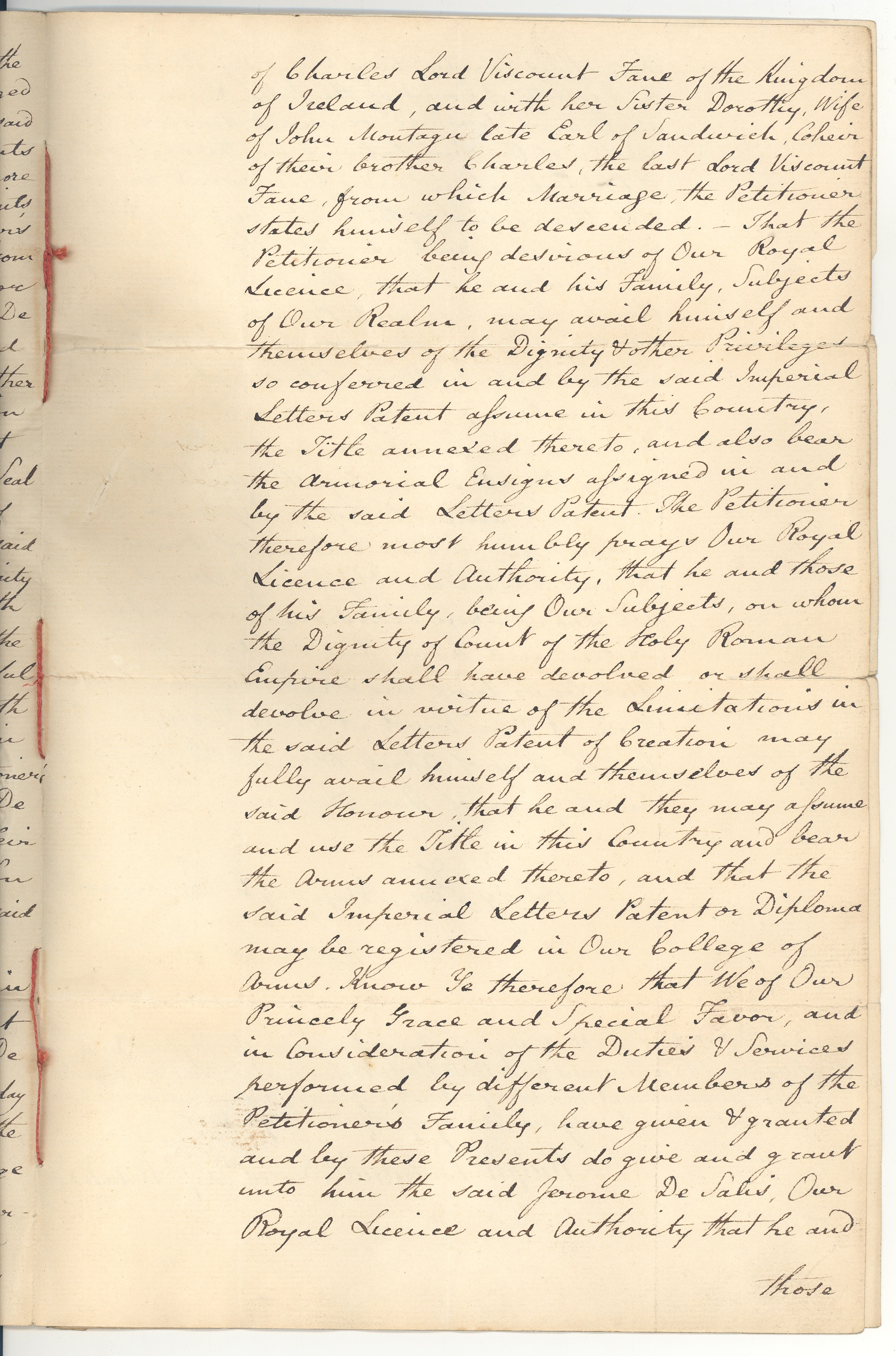
_{Page three of Licence}

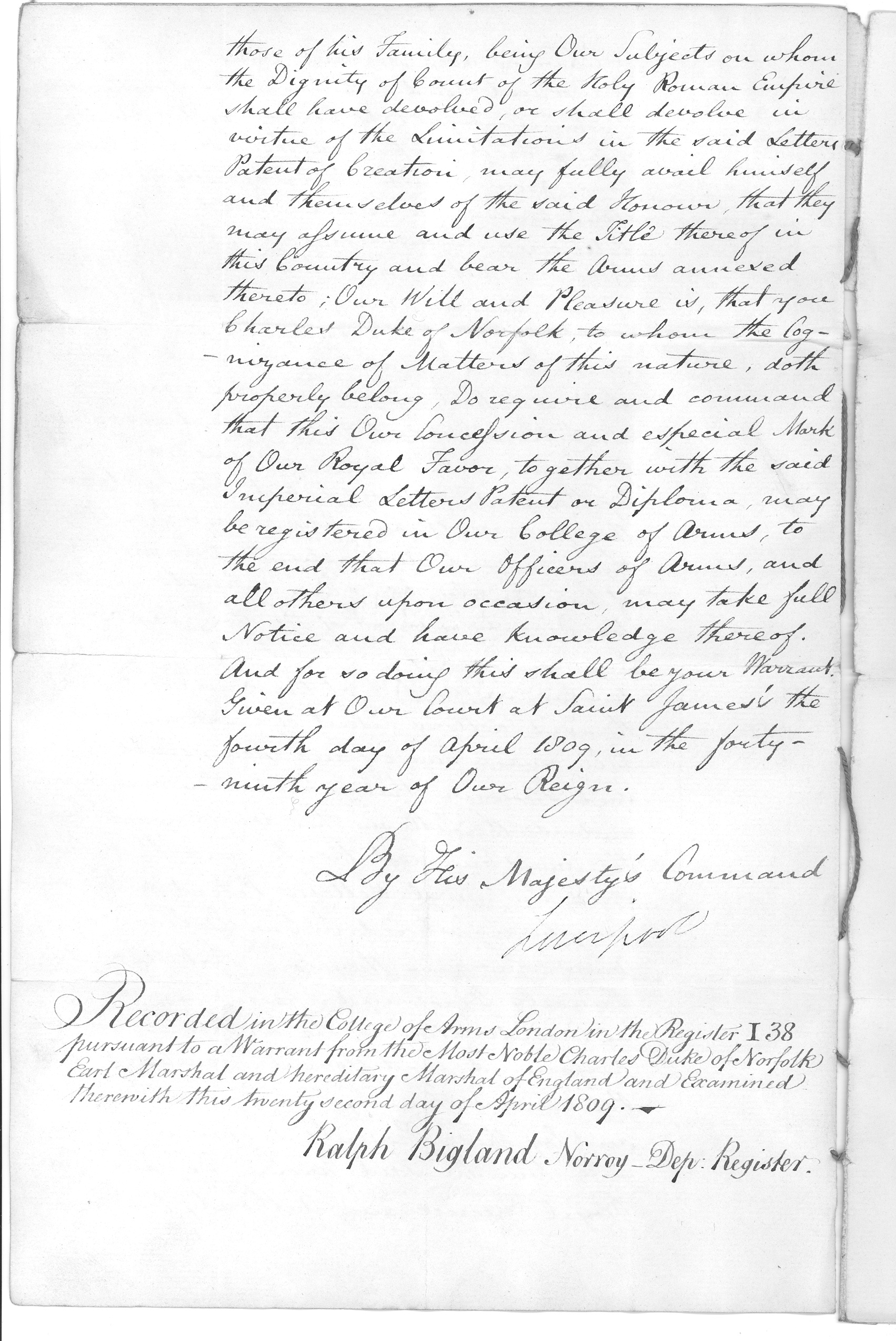
_{Page four of Licence}

== Some notable houses or land, owned or built by Counts de Salis-Soglio ==
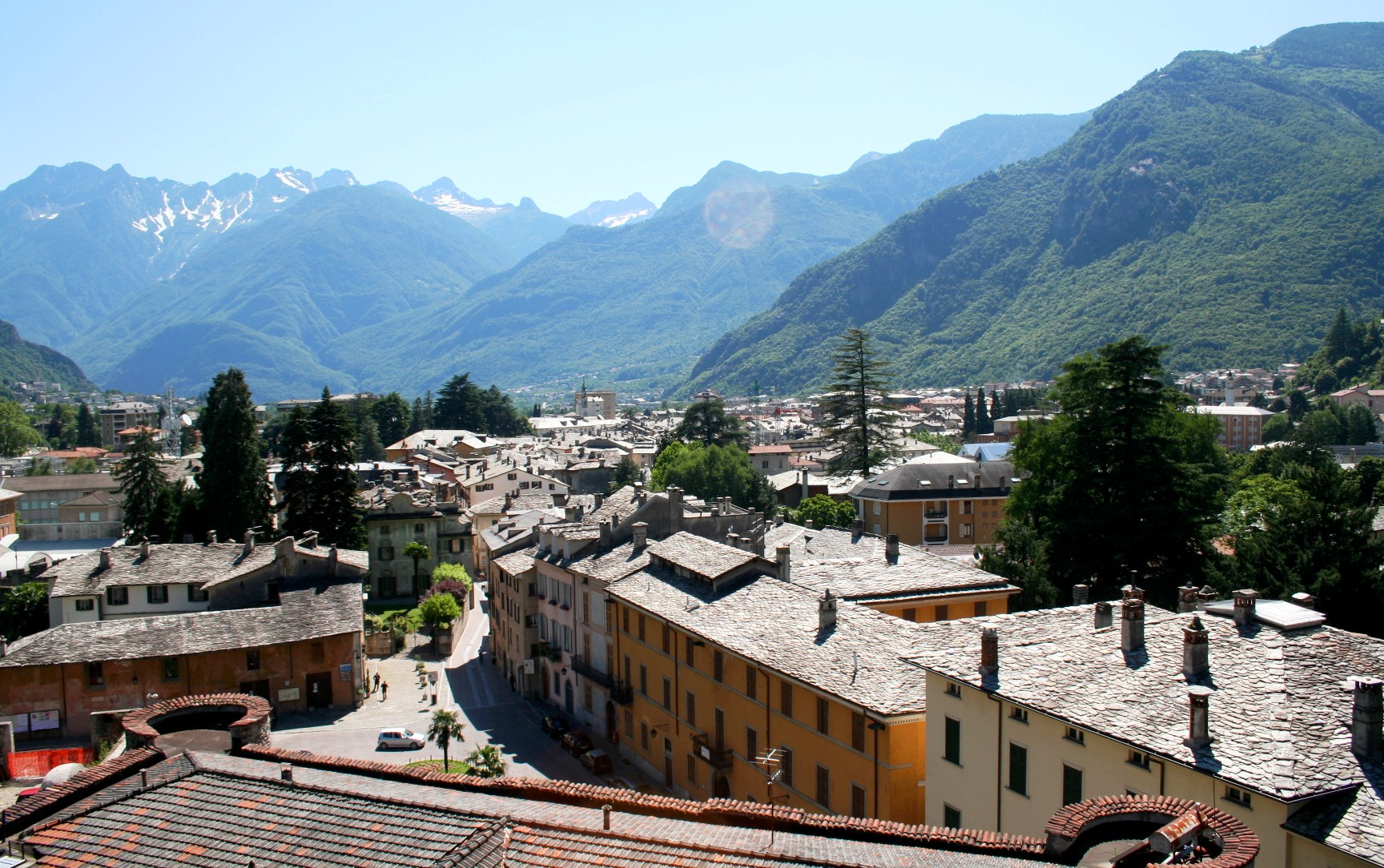
Chiavenna. 1st Count built orange coloured house to the right.

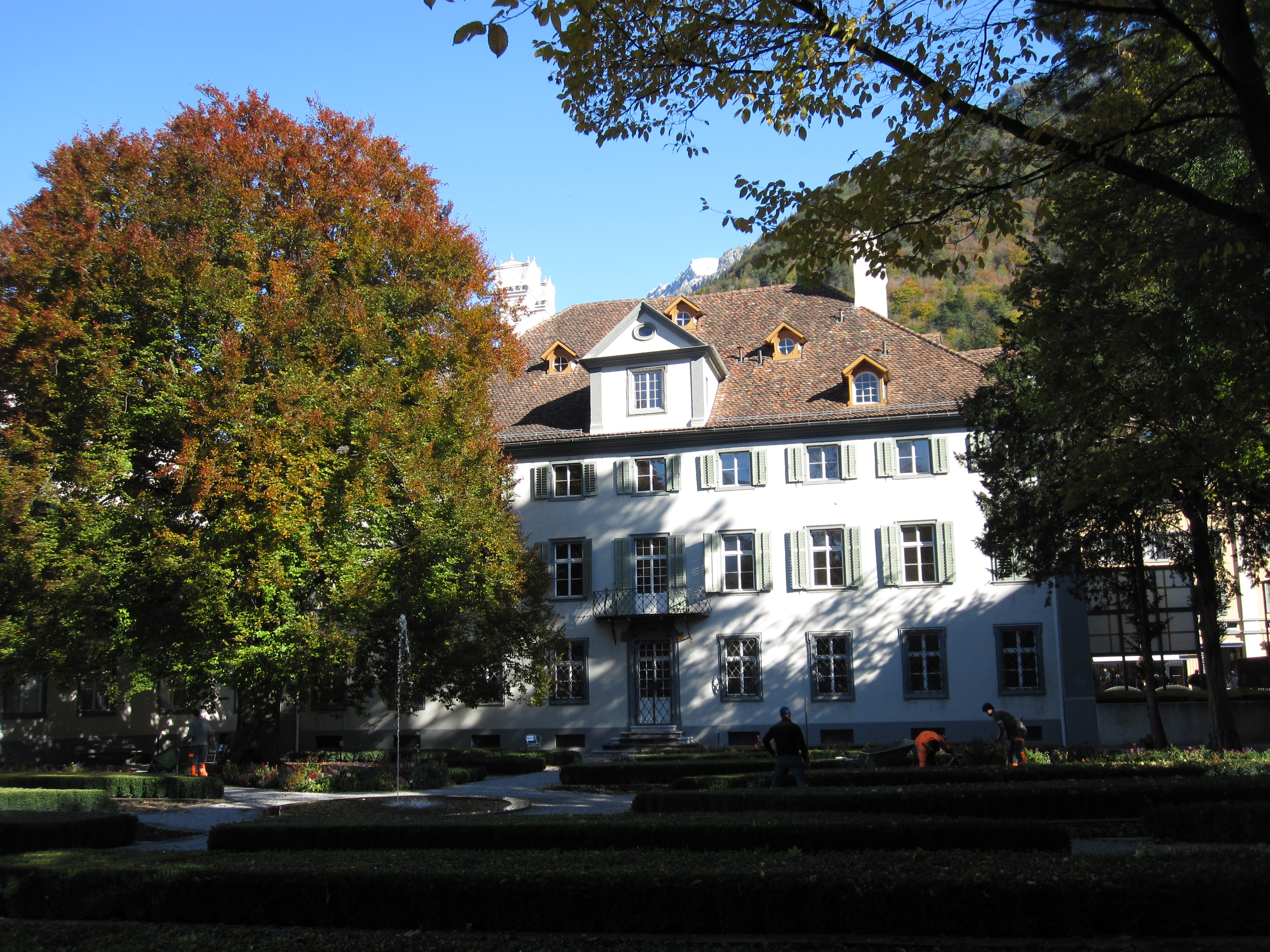
Altes Gebäu, Chur/Coire. 1st Count built this.

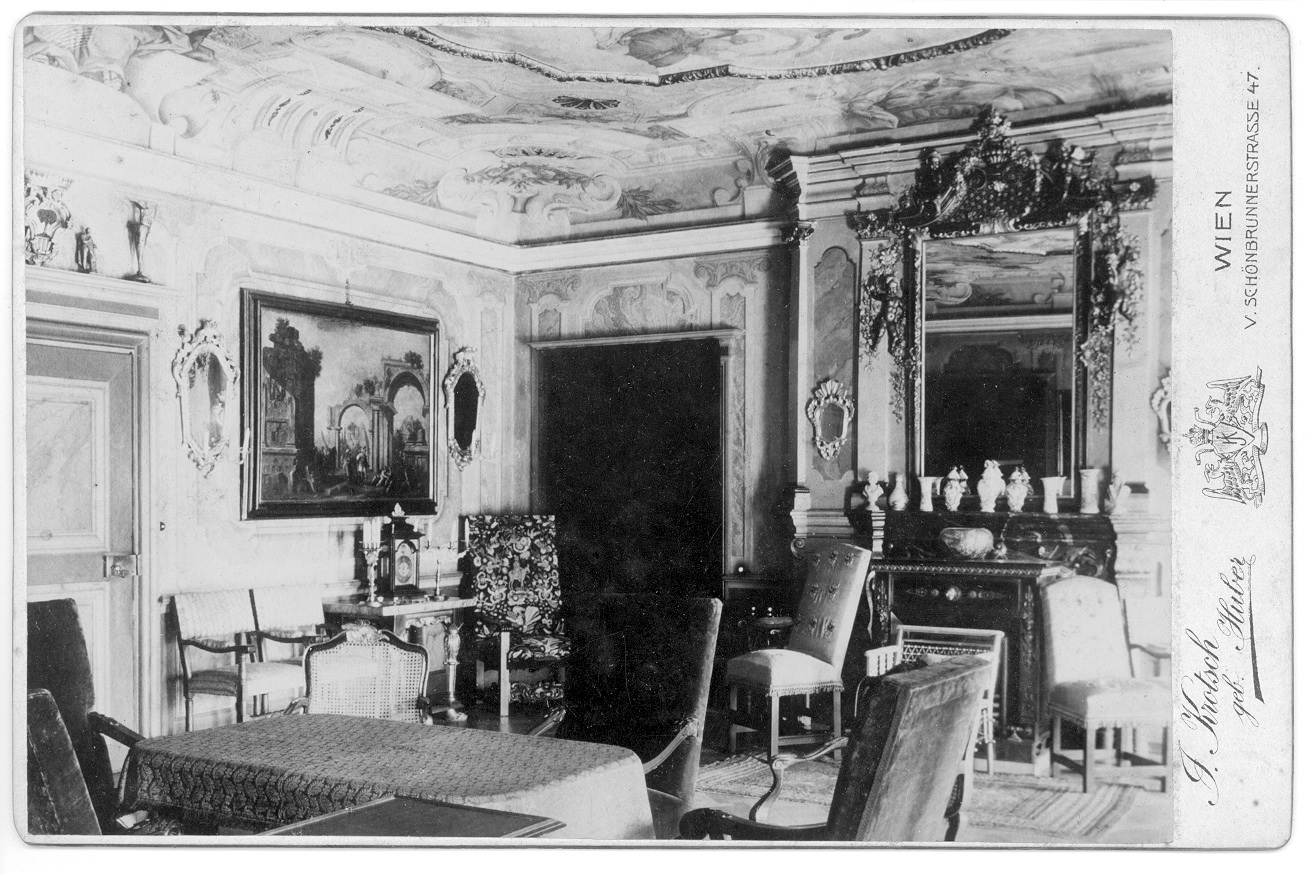
Altes Gebäu, interior

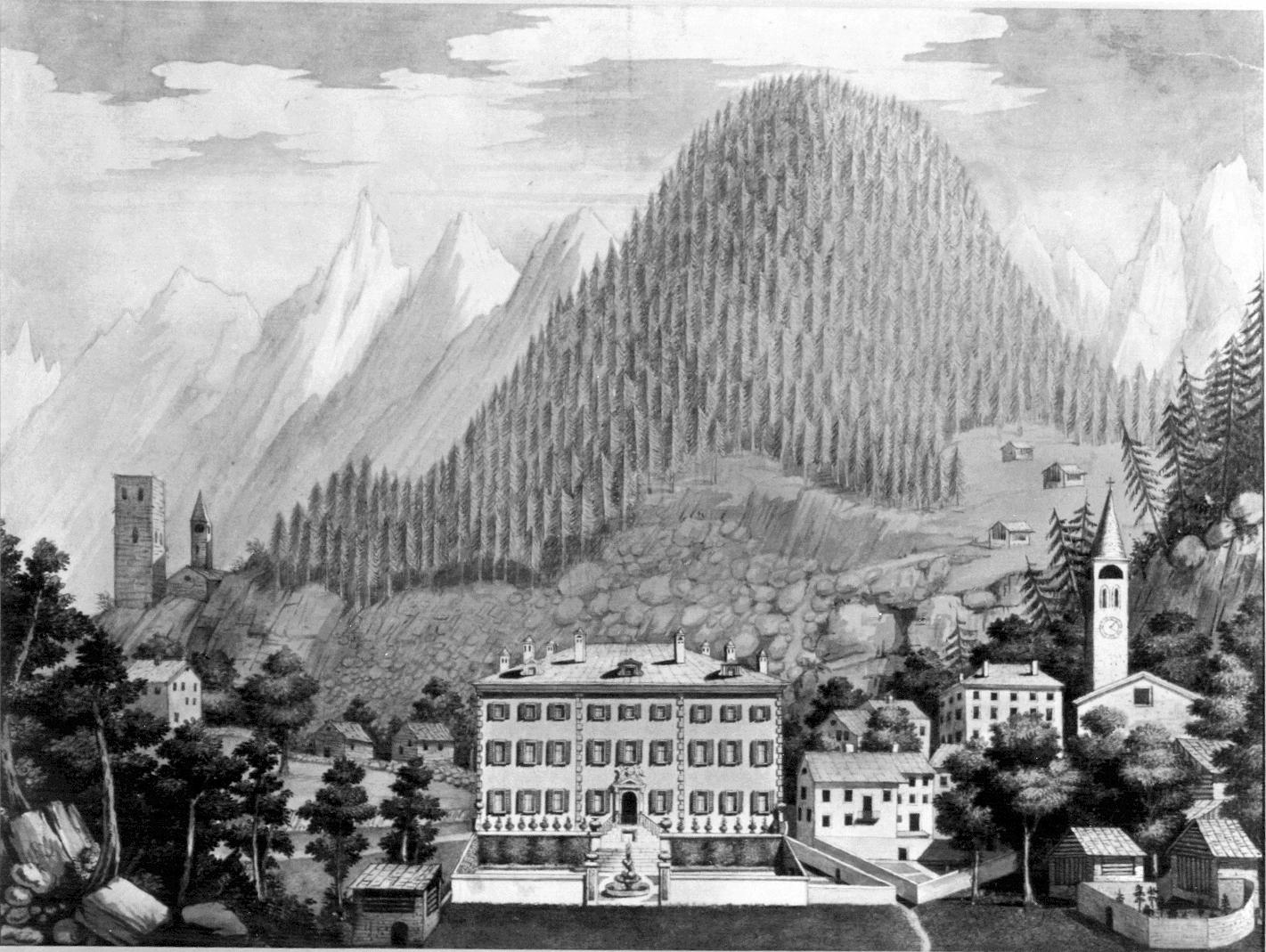
Palazzo Salis in Bondo in Bregaglia. 2nd & 3rd Counts built this.

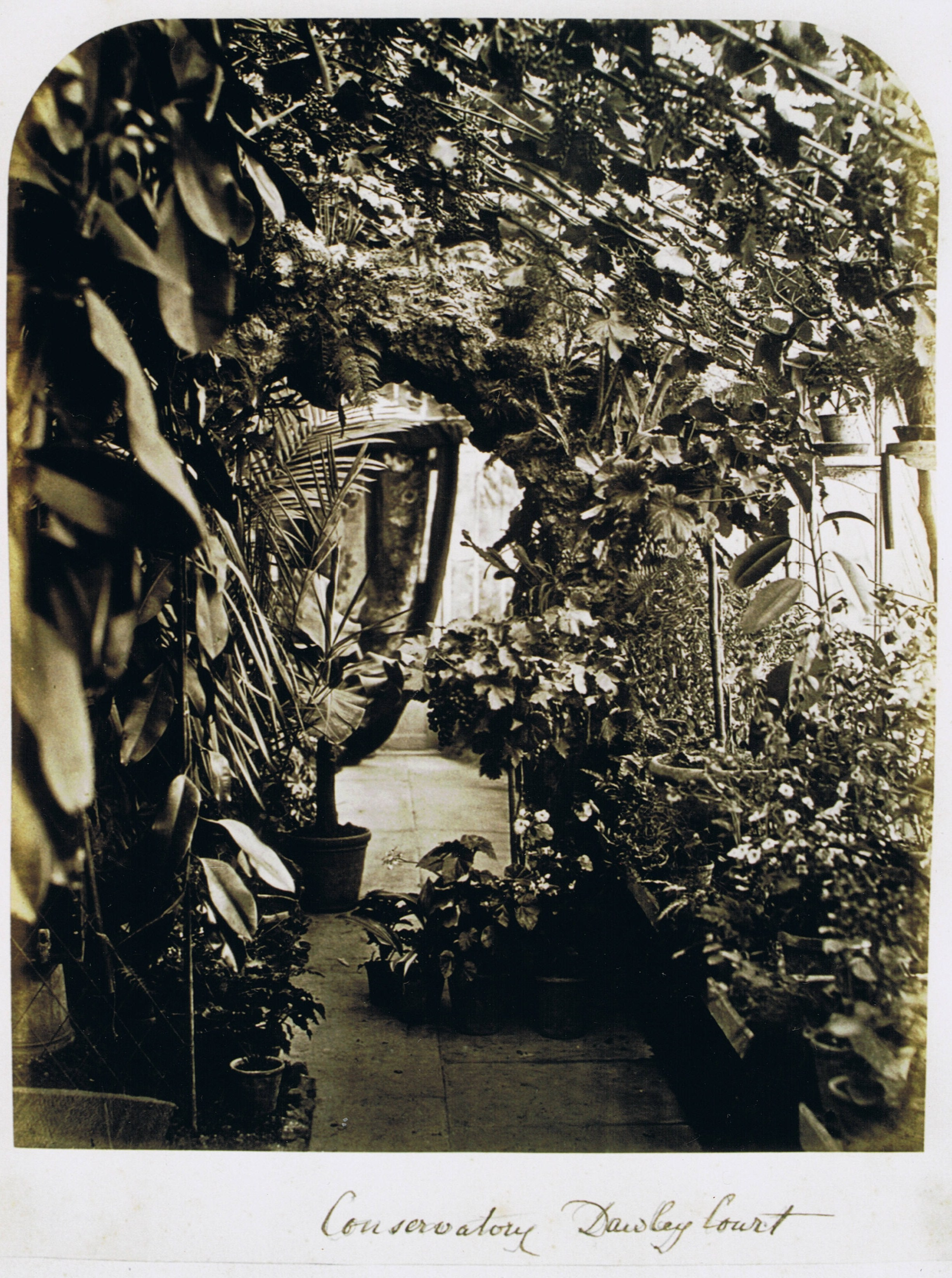
Dawley, south of Hillingdon. 4th Count lived here.

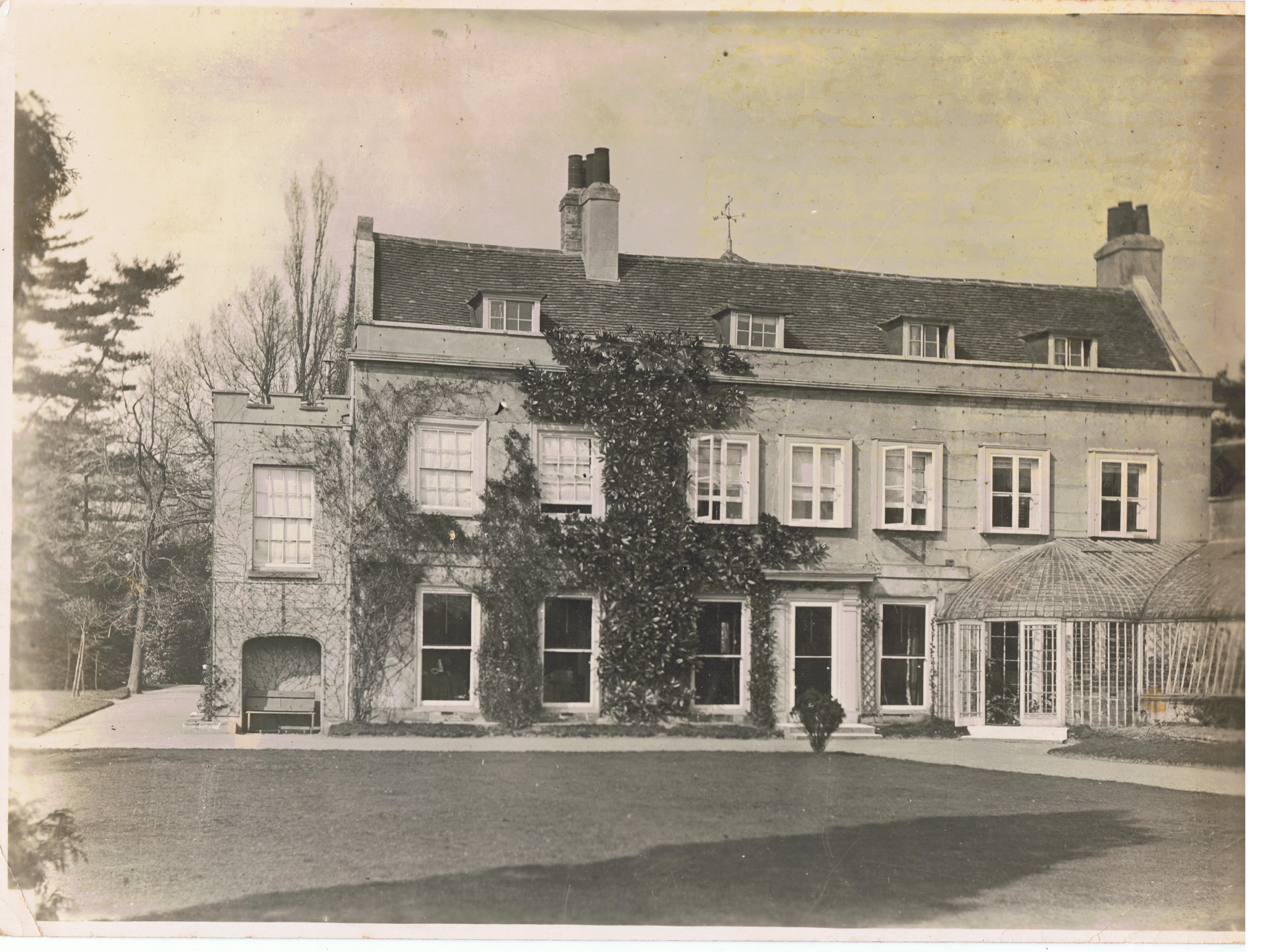
Dawley Court, Goulds Green, Hillingdon, Middlesex, c1890.

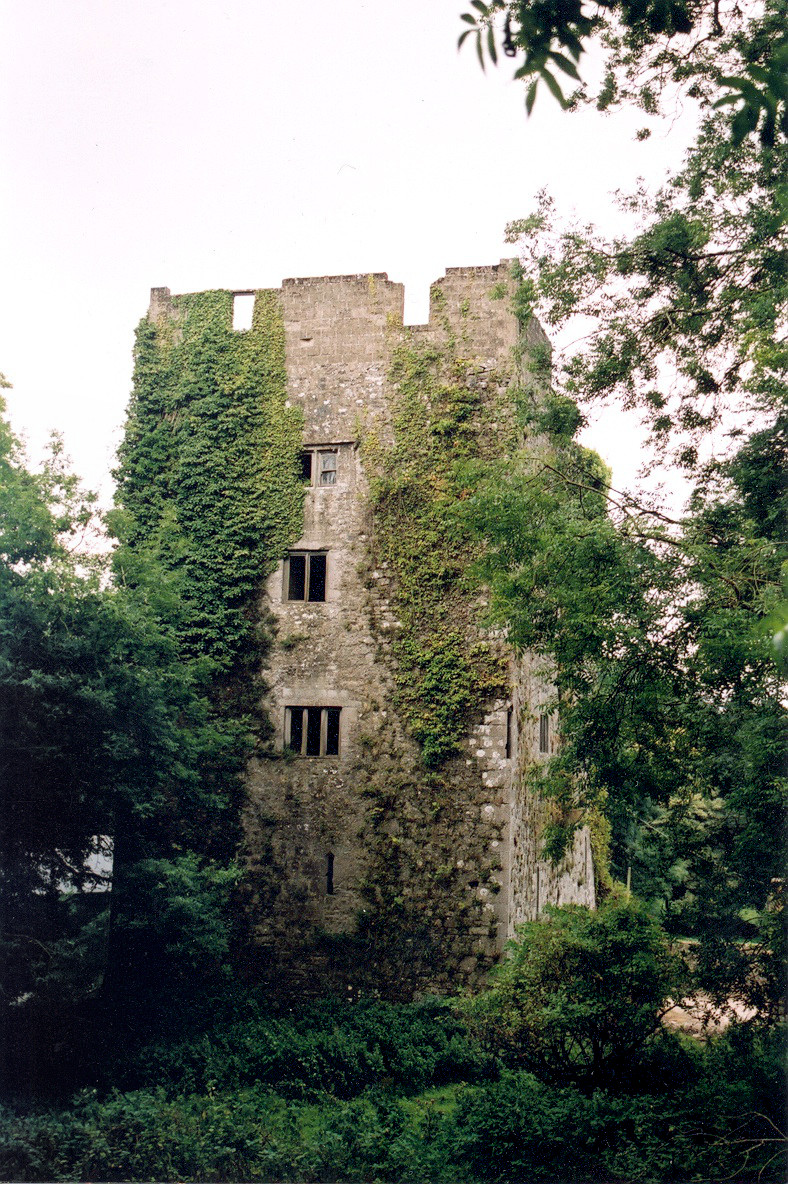
Bourchier Tower, at the heart of Bourchier & Fane derived Irish estate in county Limerick.

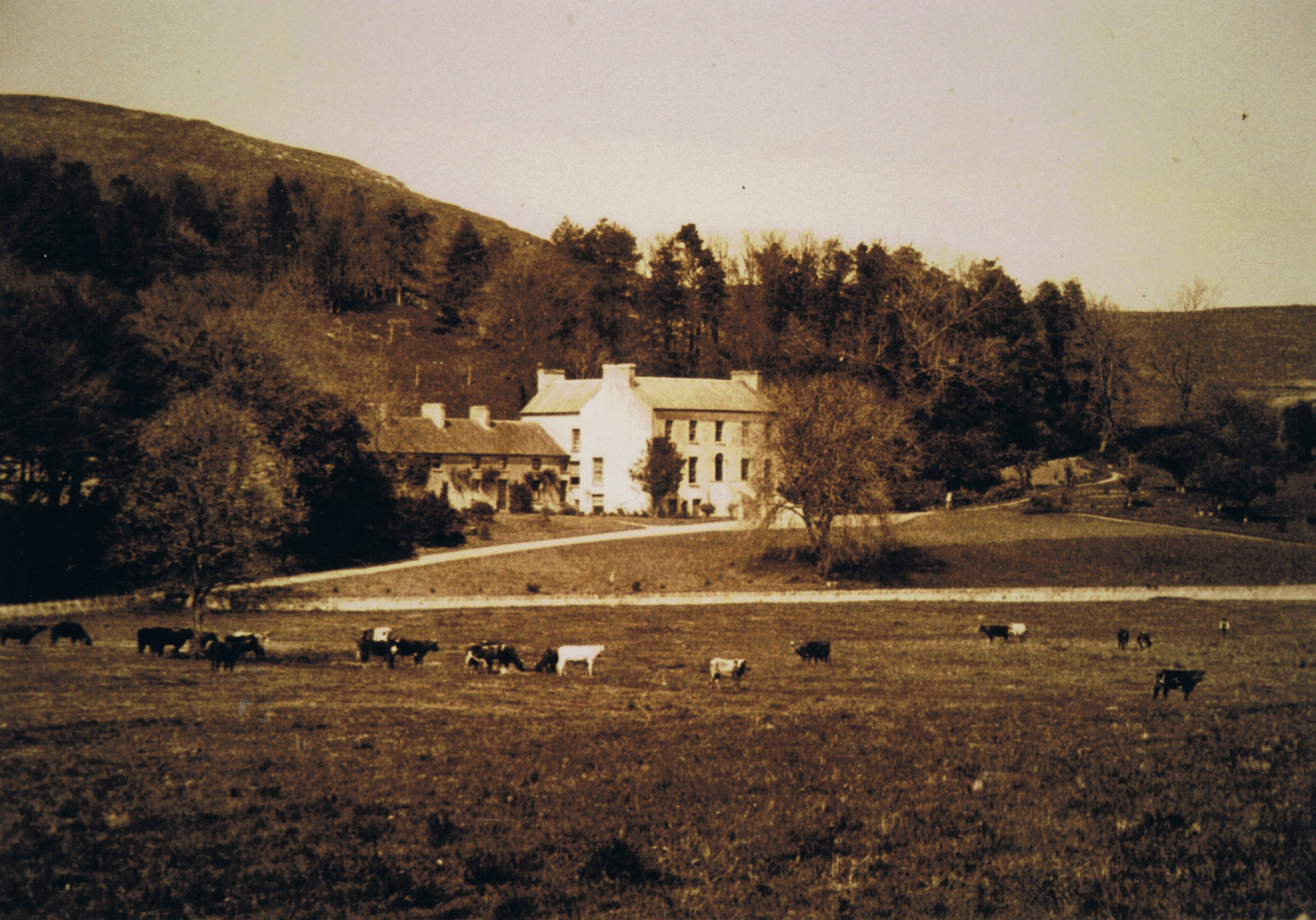
Lough Gur House (Grange Hill), county Limerick. 7th Count lived here.

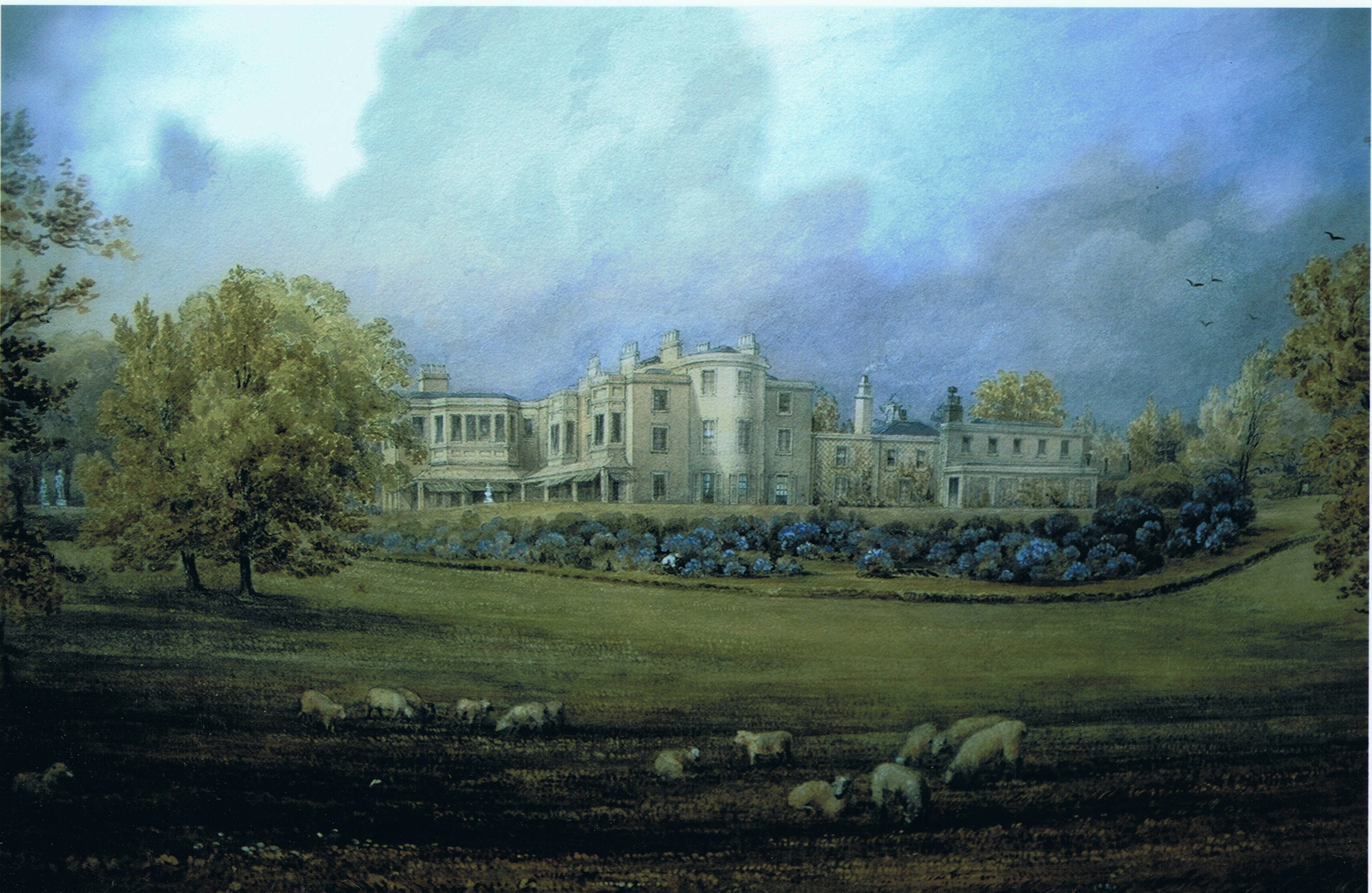
Portnall Park, Virginia Water, Surrey, UK, owned by the de Salis family between 1872 and 1923

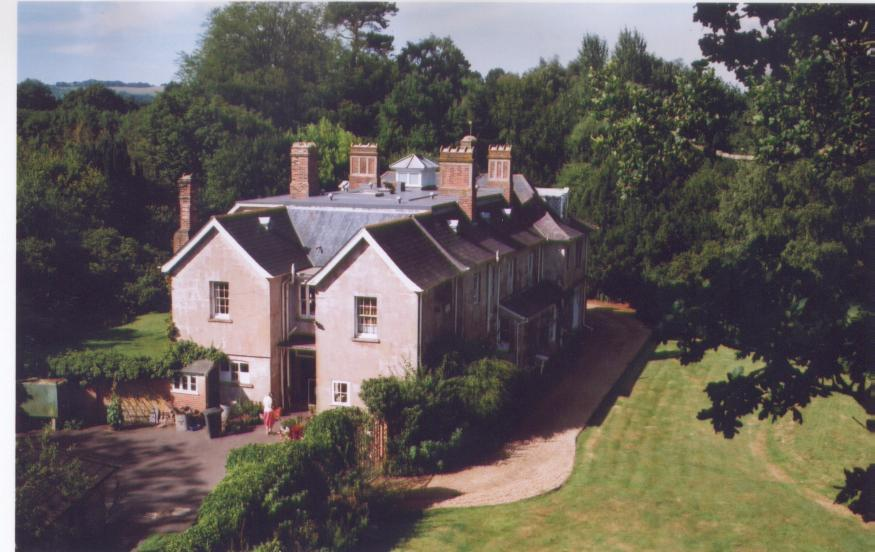
Bourne House, East Woodhay, Hampshire, UK, owned between 1946 and 2006

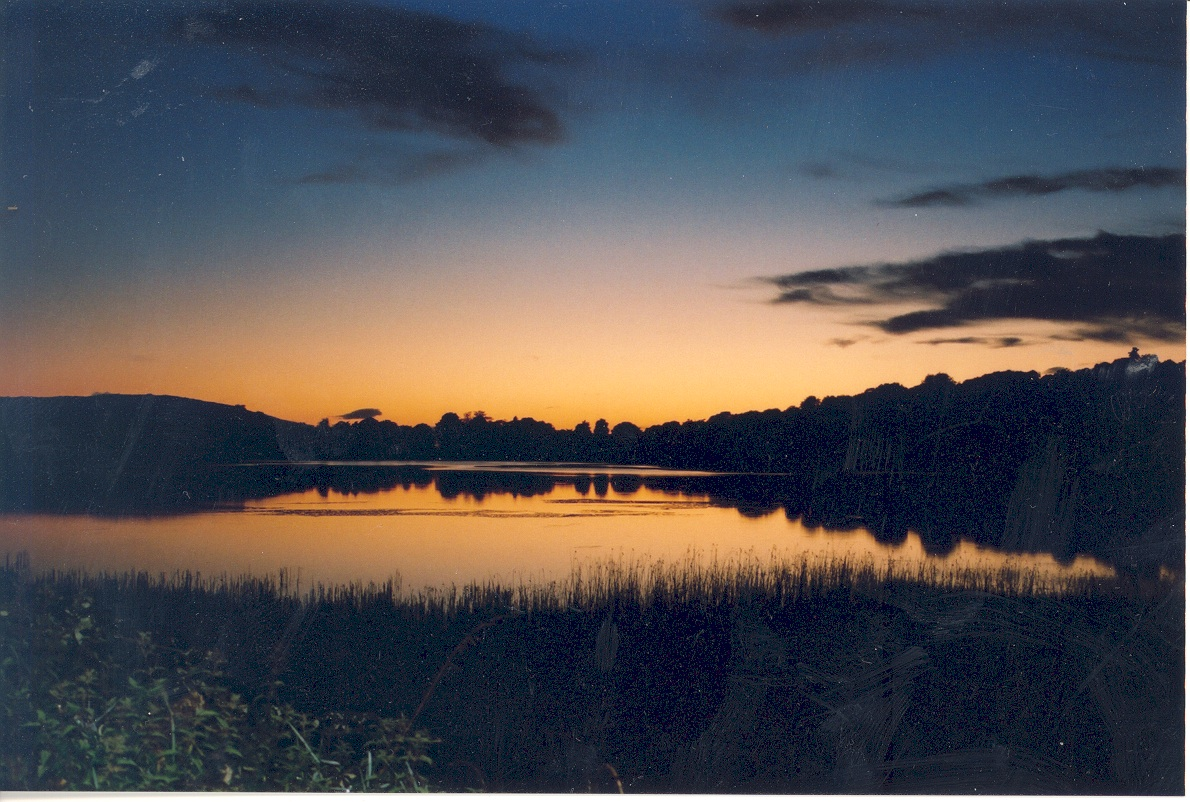
Lough Gur, 2005. The lake was sold to Limerick County Council by the 9th Count in 1979.

== Countesses de Salis-Soglio ==
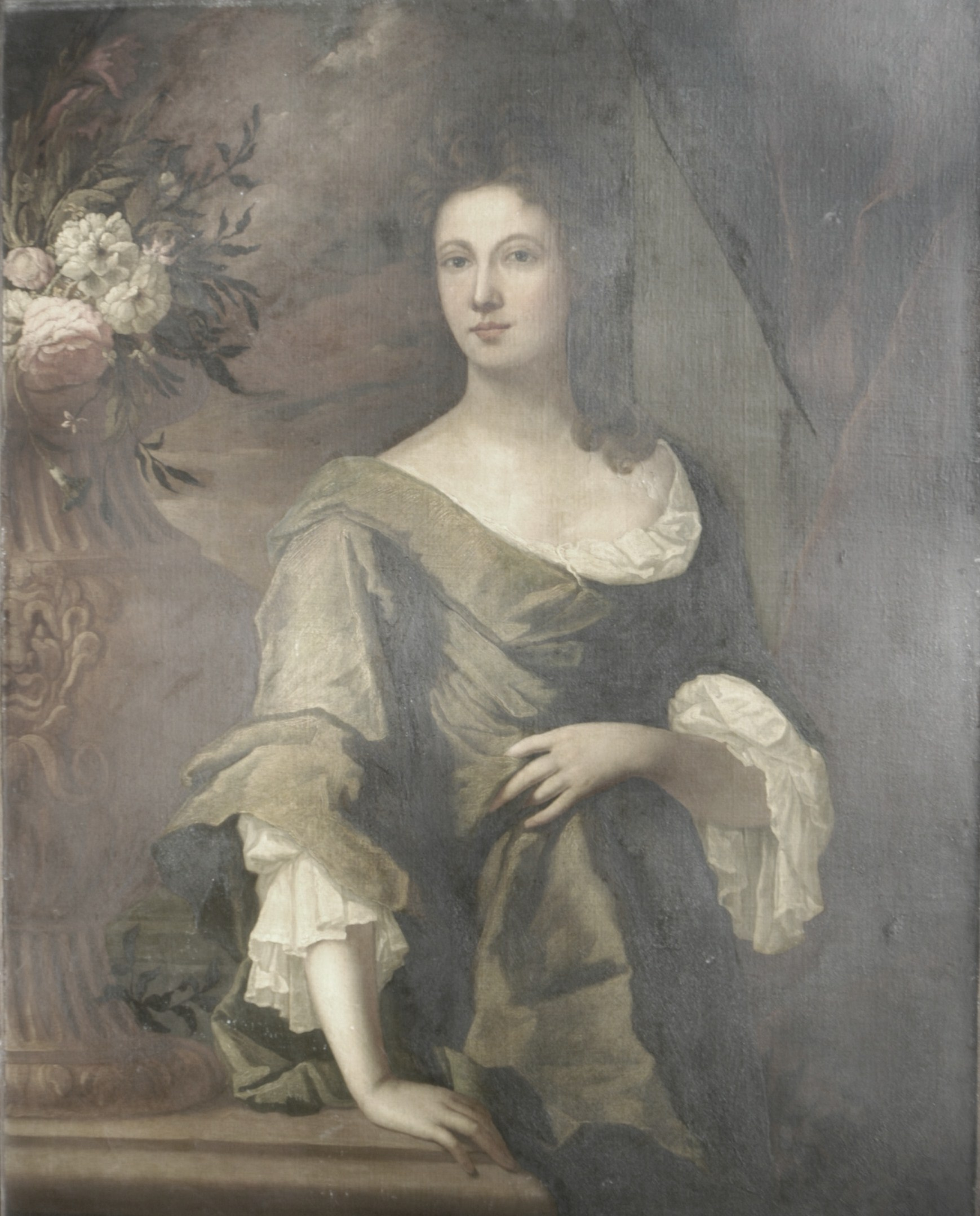
Hon. Mary Fane, wife to 2nd Count.

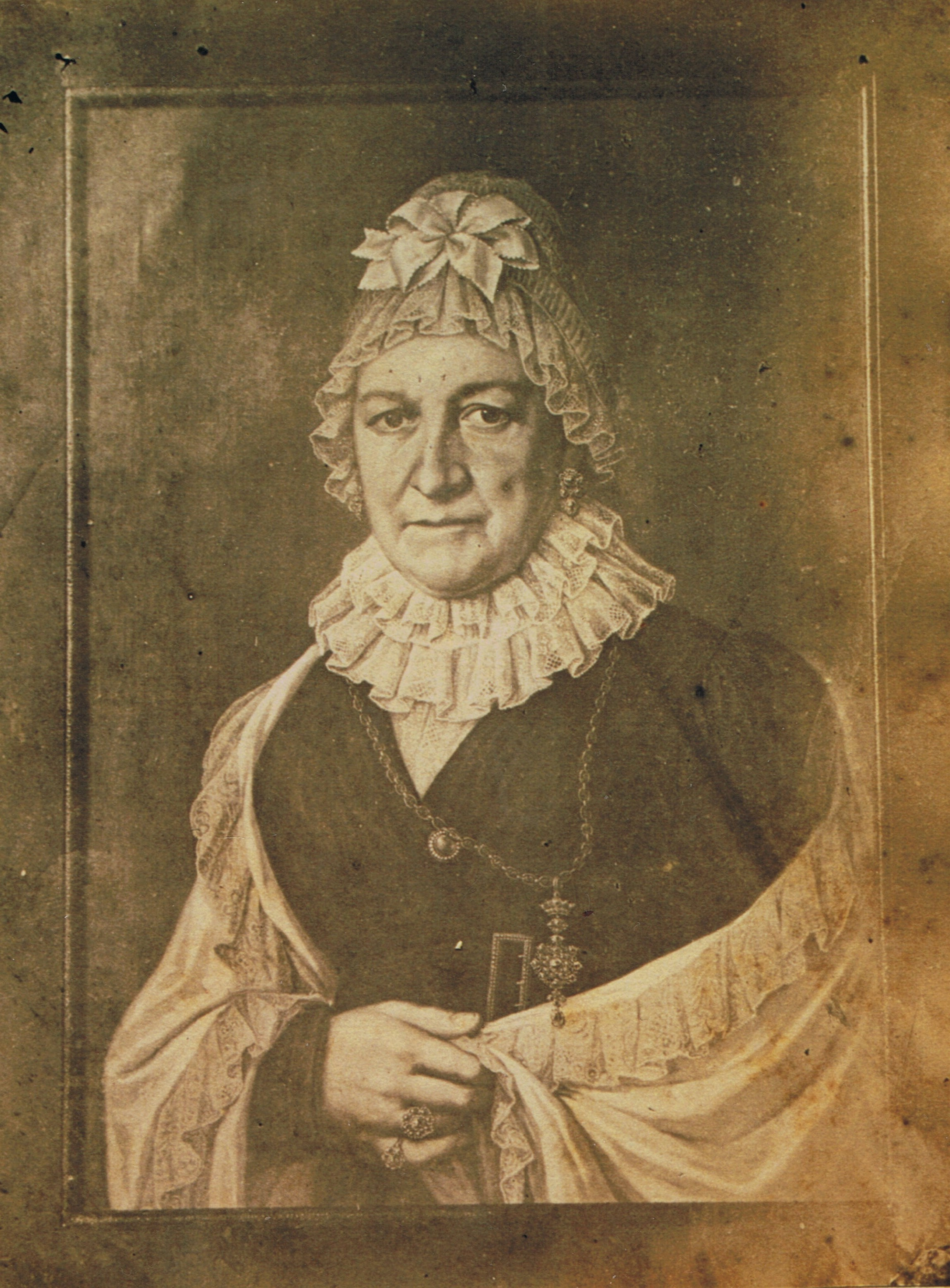
Anna v. Salis-Sogio, third wife to 3rd Count.

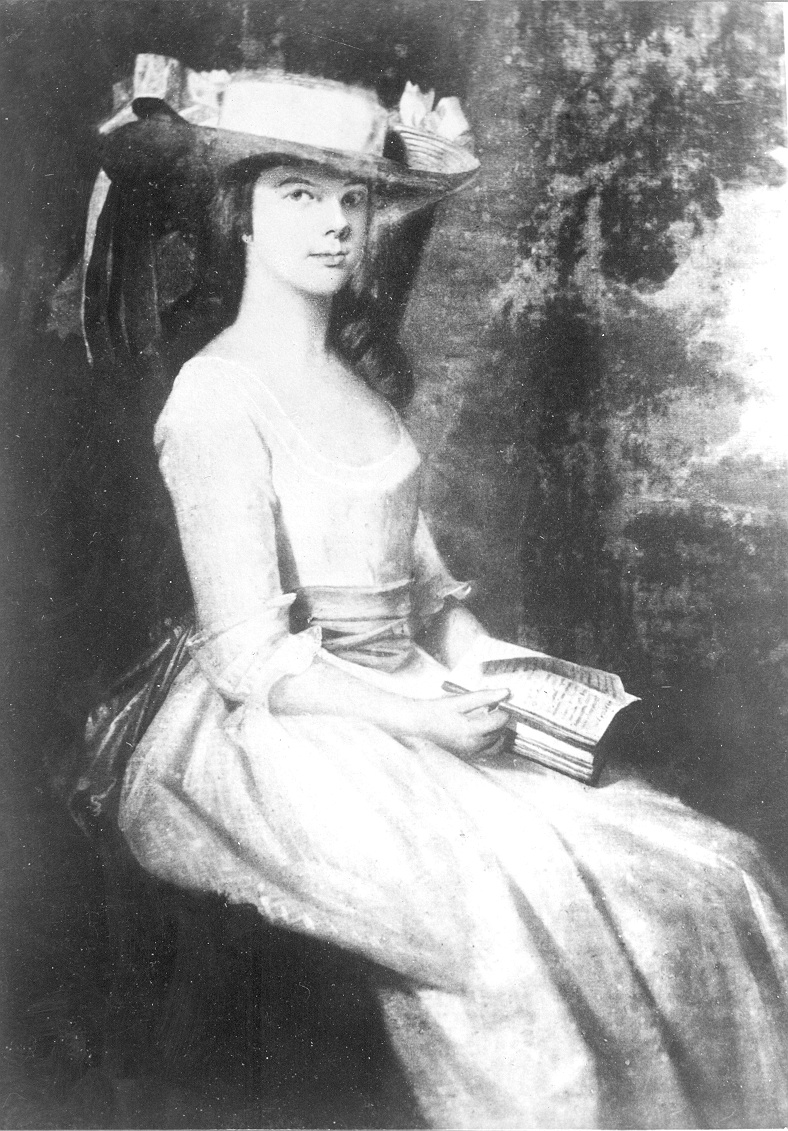
Sophia Drake, first wife to 4th Count.

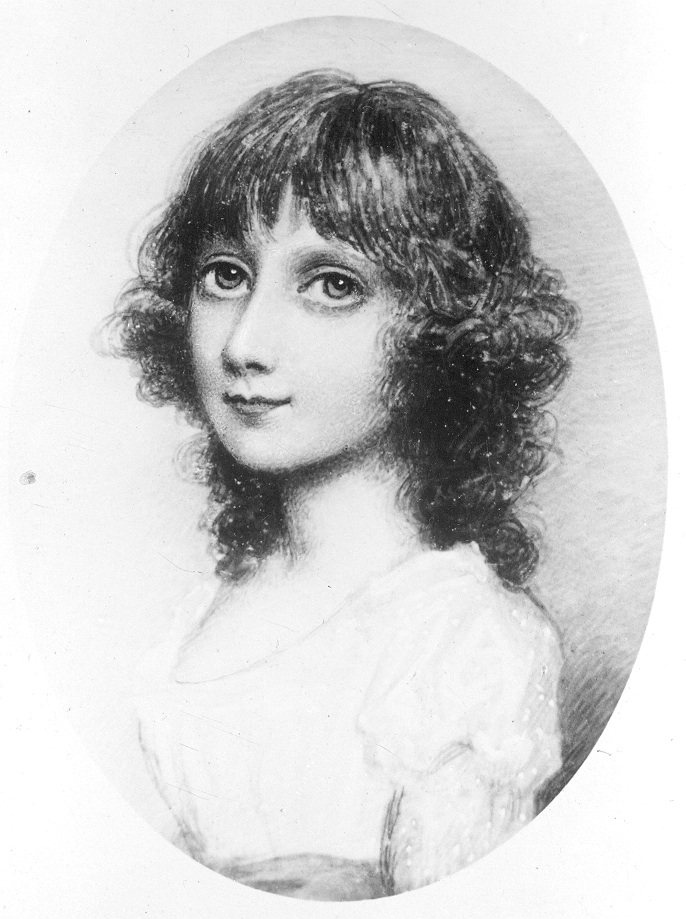
Penelope Freeman, second wife to 4th Count.

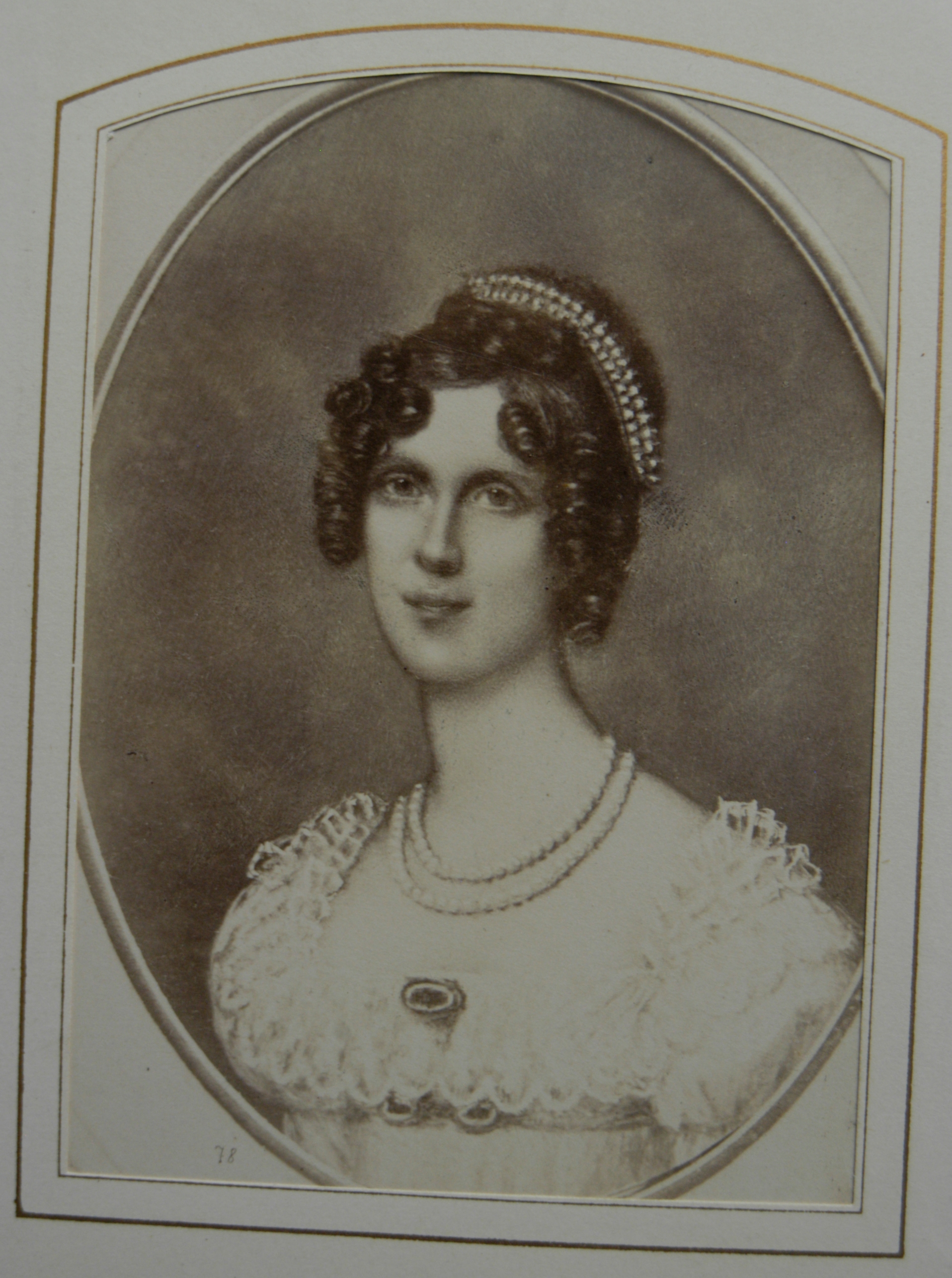
Henrietta Foster, third wife to 4th Count.

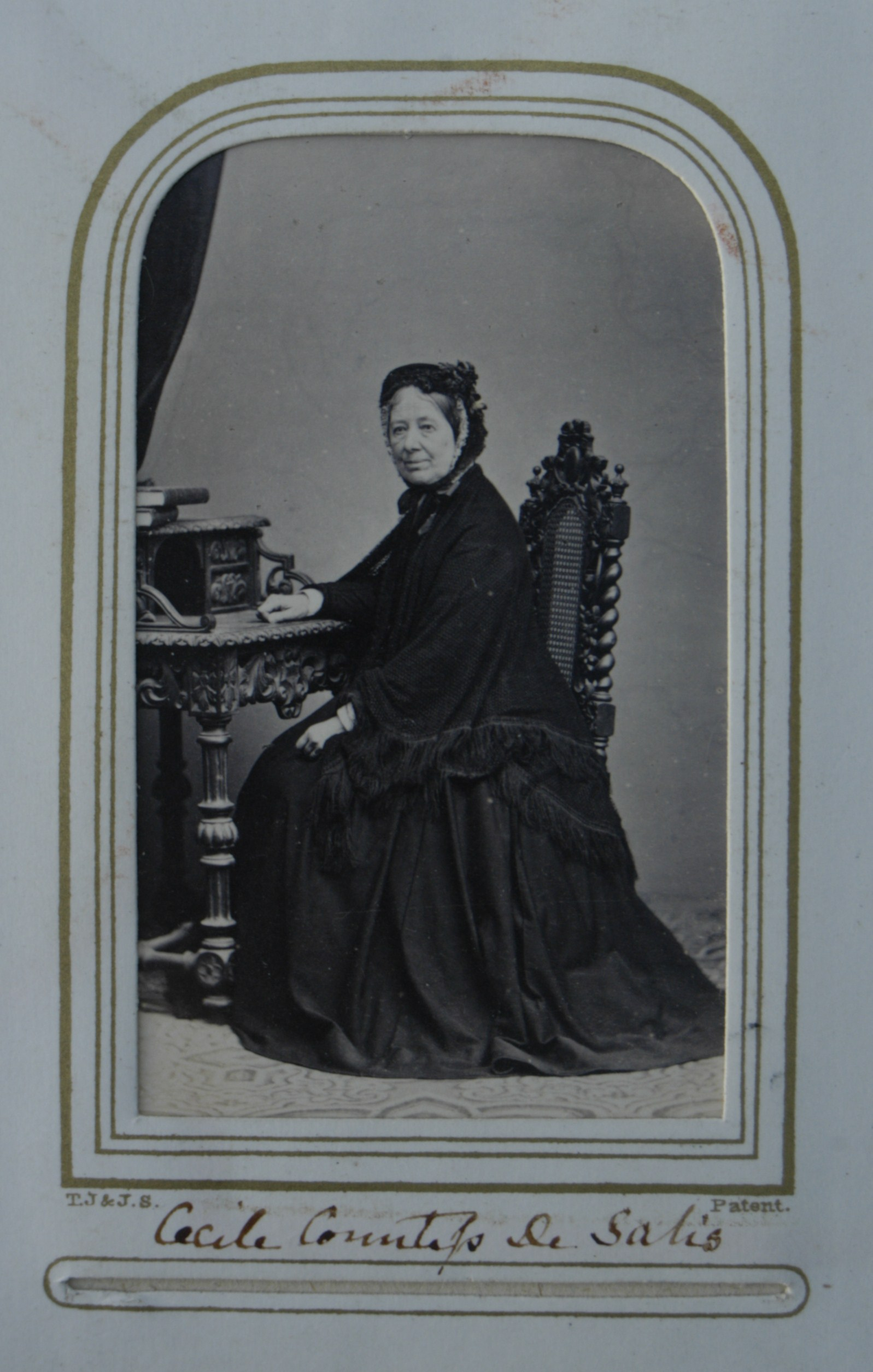
Cecile Henrietta Marguerite Bourgeoise, second wife to 5th Count.

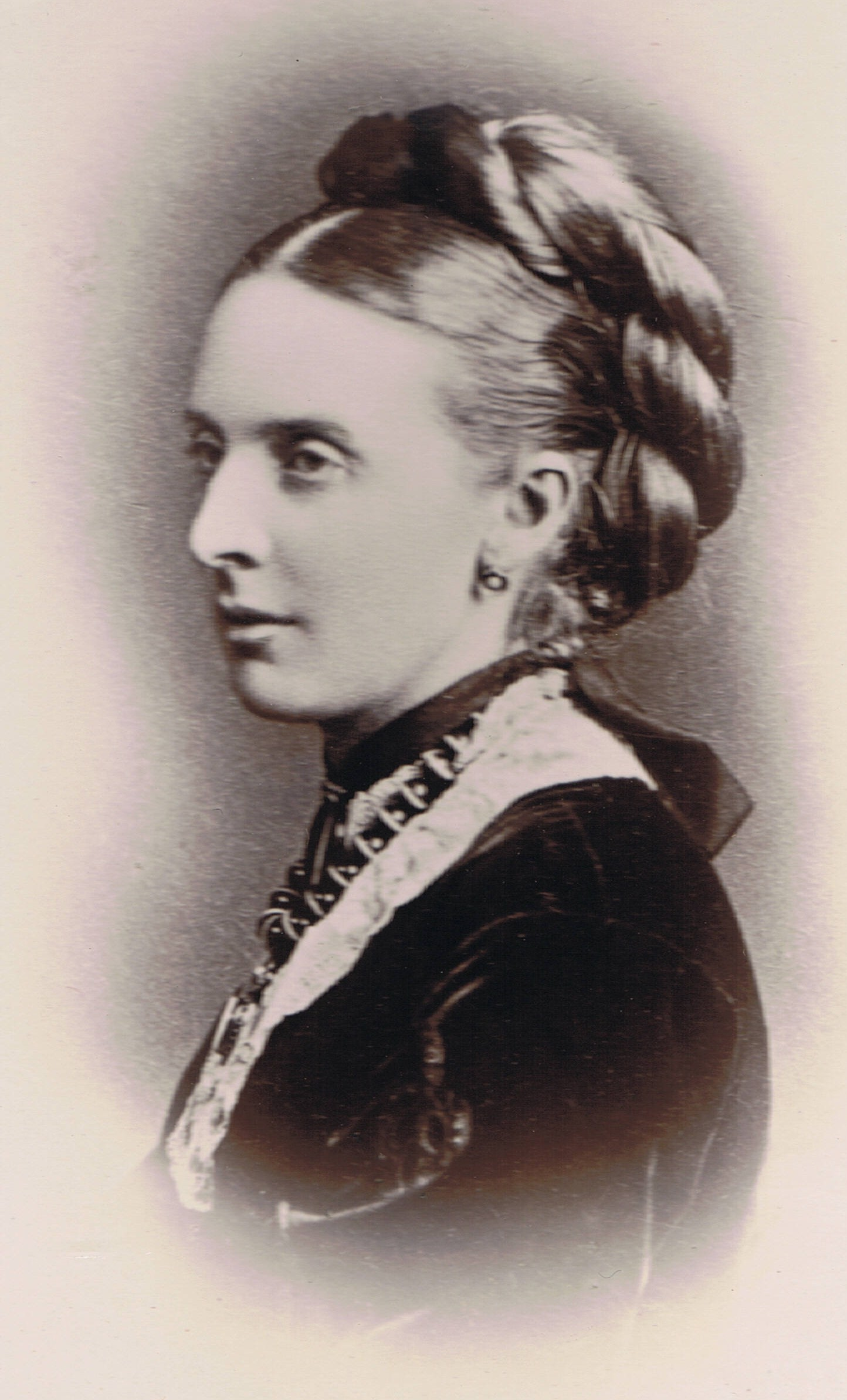
Amelia Frances Harriet Tower, wife to 6th Count.

== Some countly arms ==
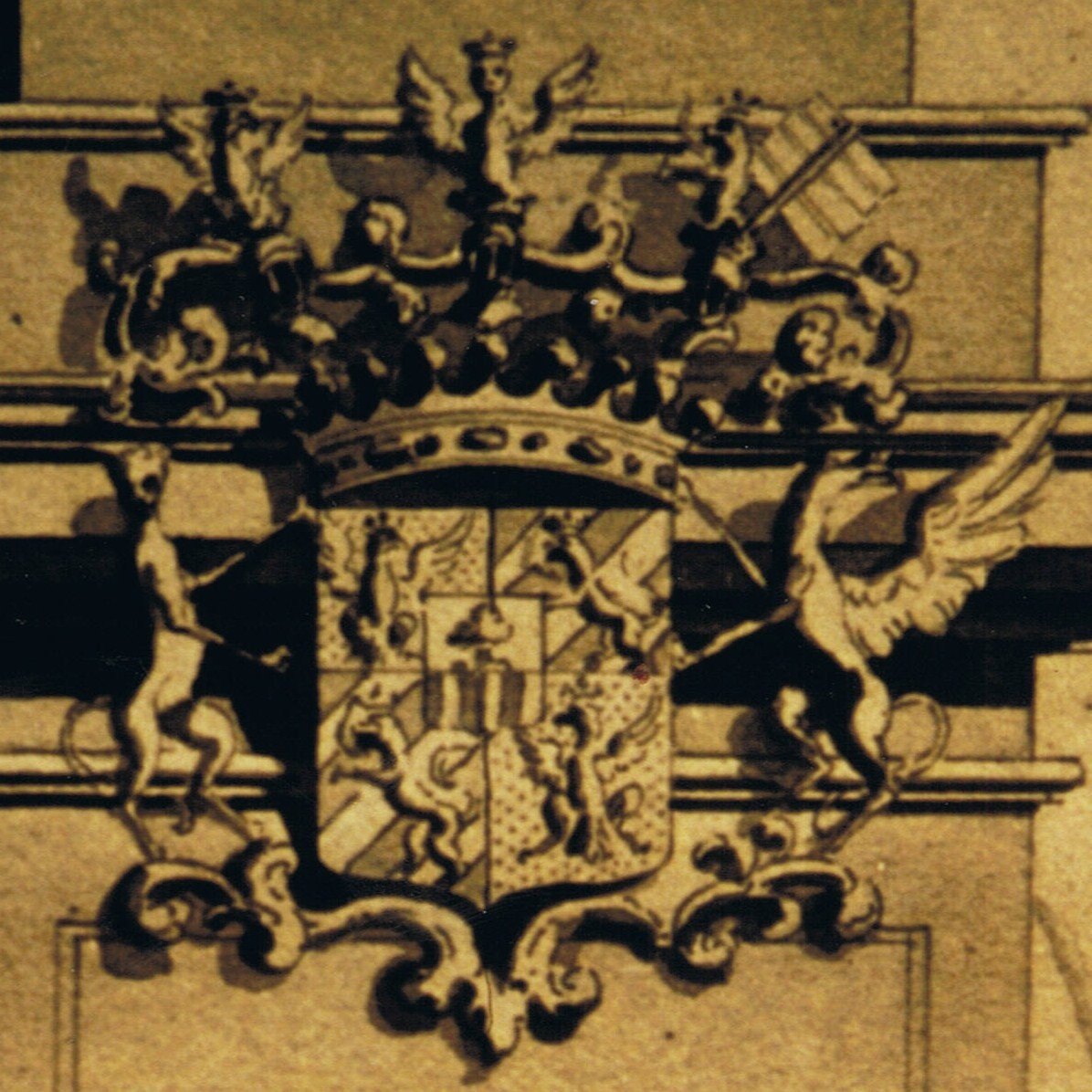
Chiavenna

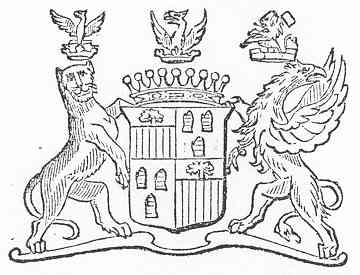
From 1851 edition of Burke's Peerage (Foreign Titles section)

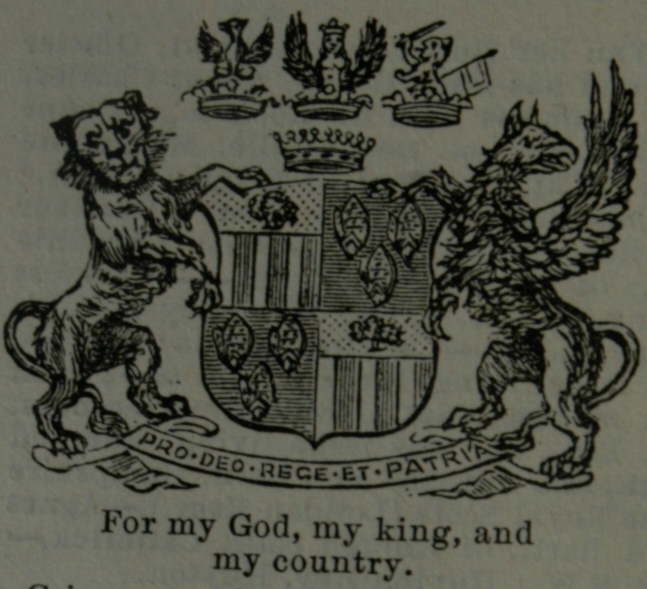
Debrett's Peerage, London, 1888.

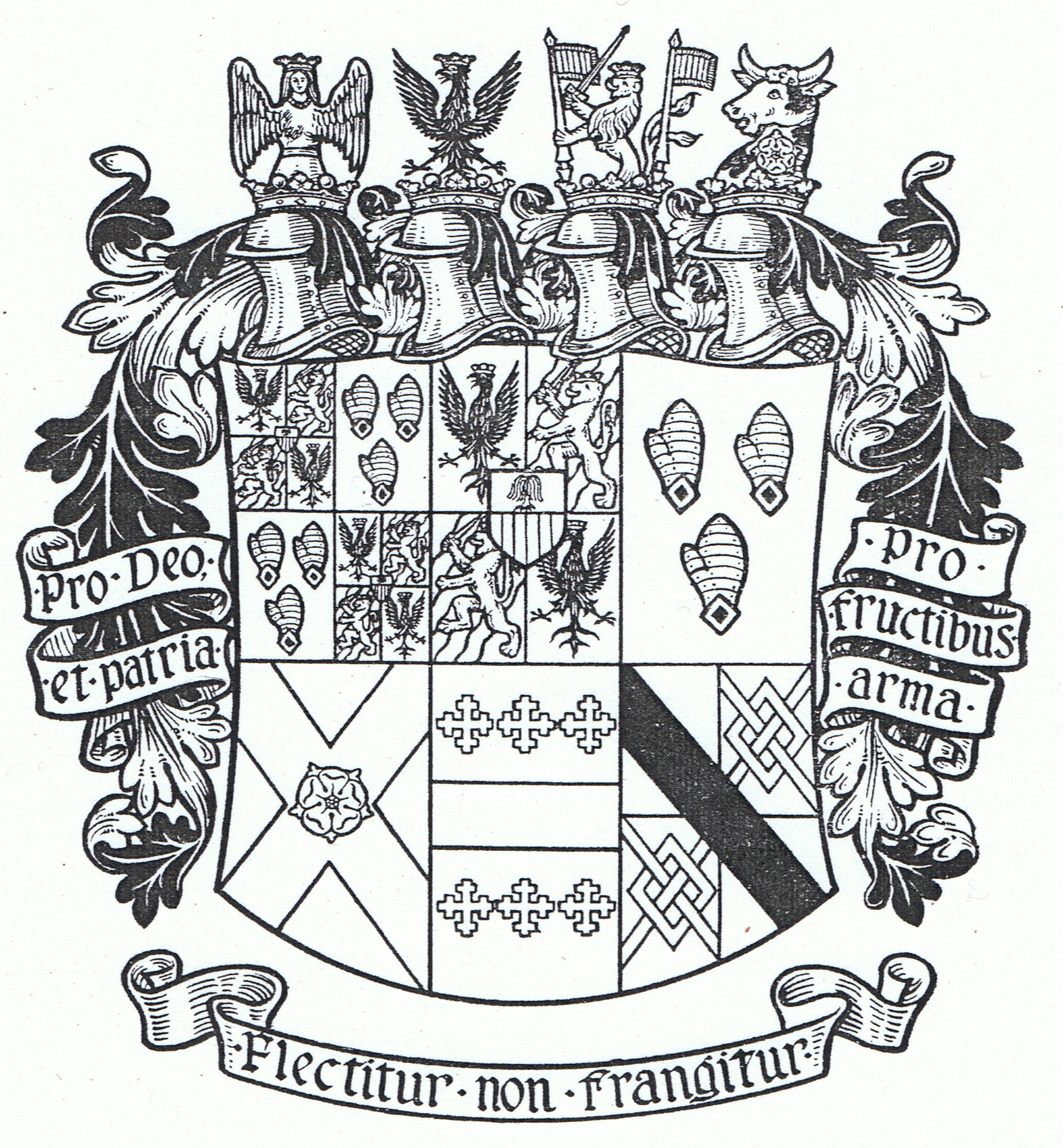
Armorial Achievement from Fox-Davies, 1929

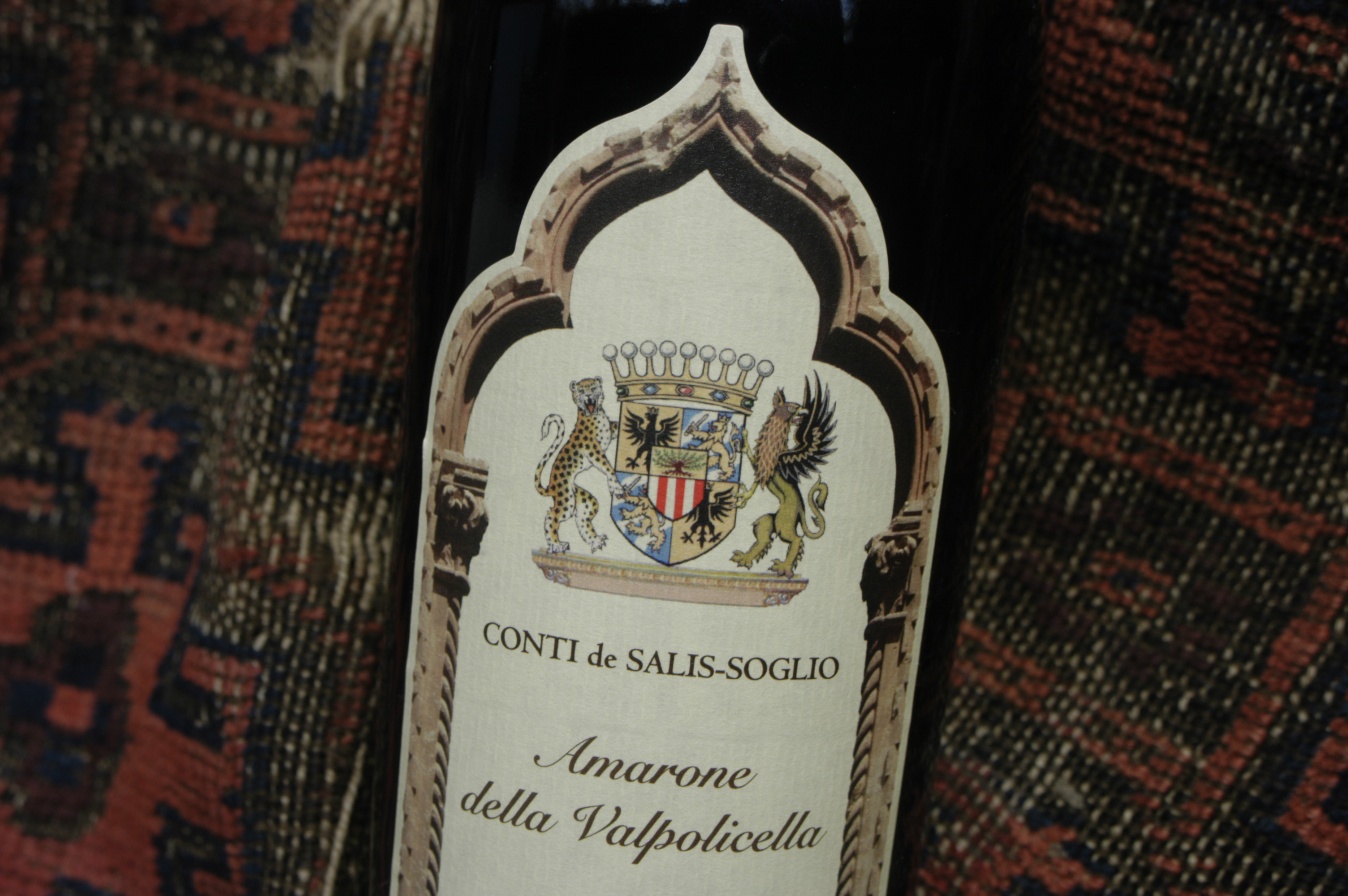

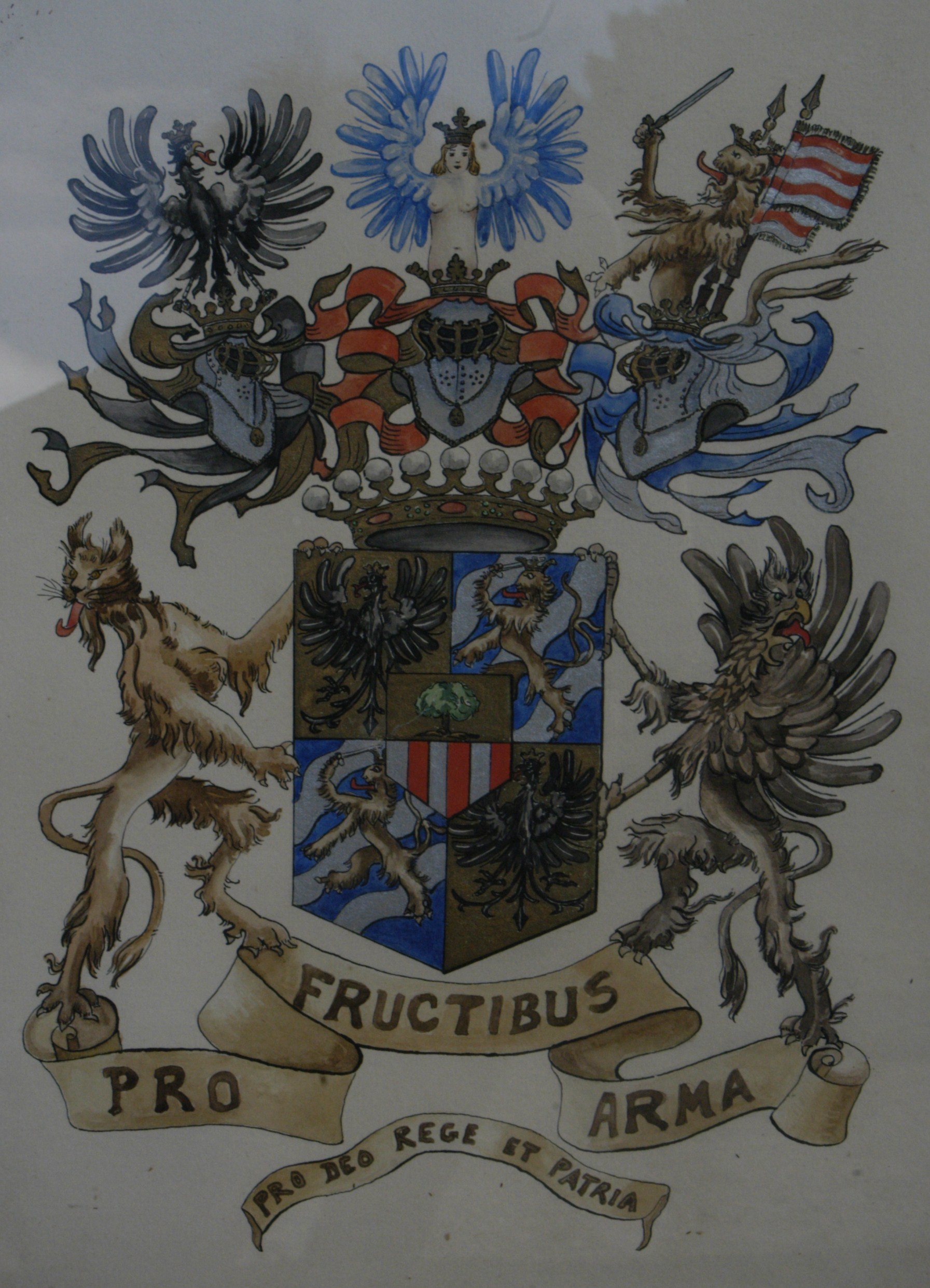

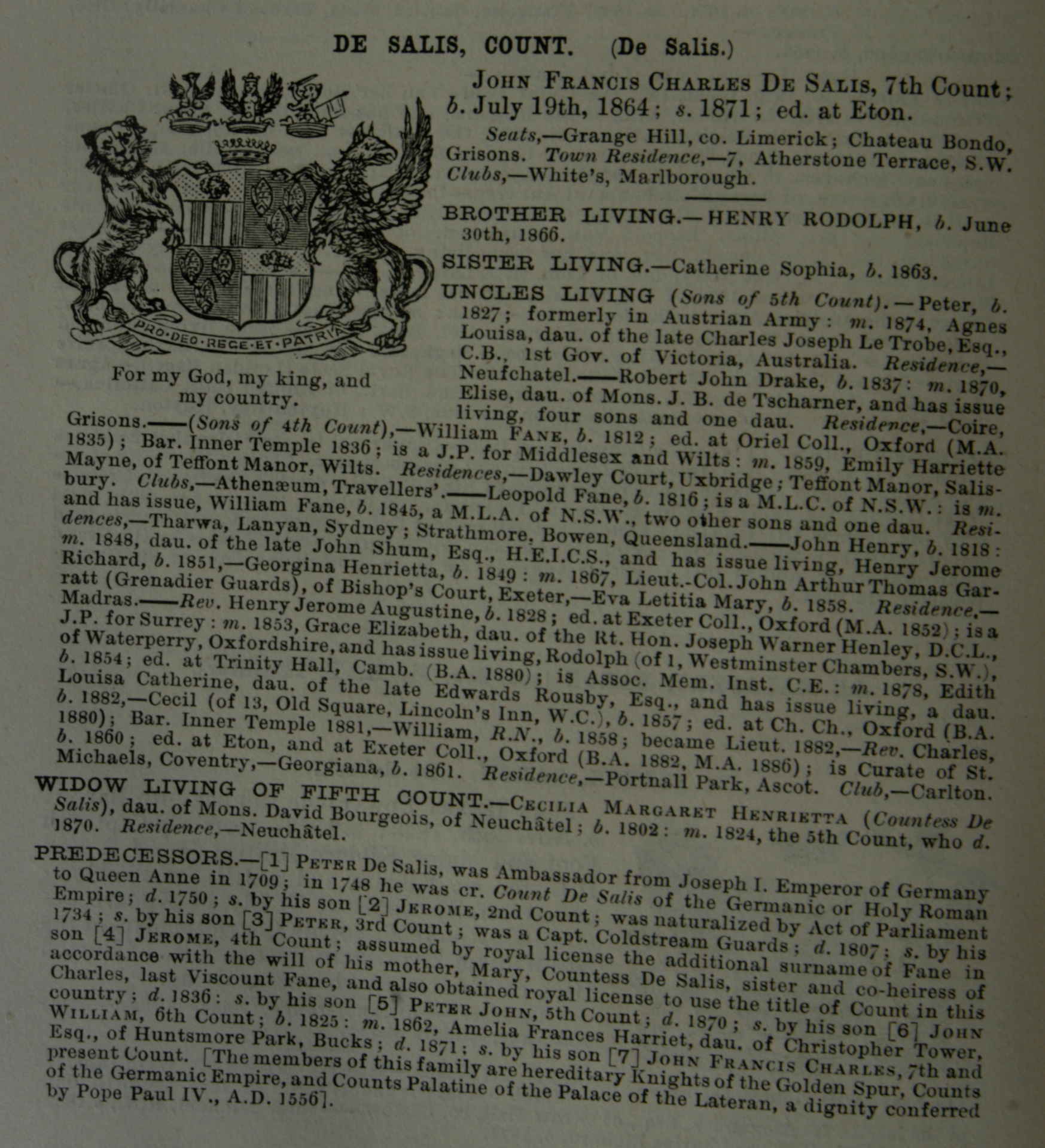
Debrett's Peerage 1888, Foreign Titles of Nobility section, page 822.

== Some crests and coronets ==
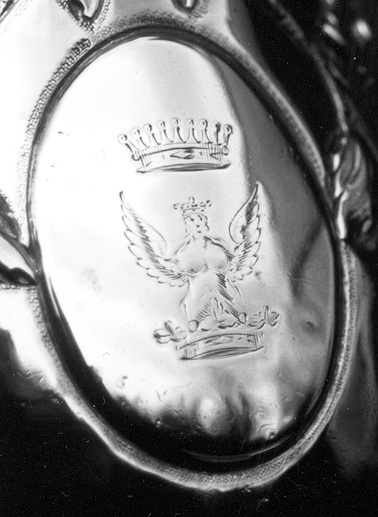

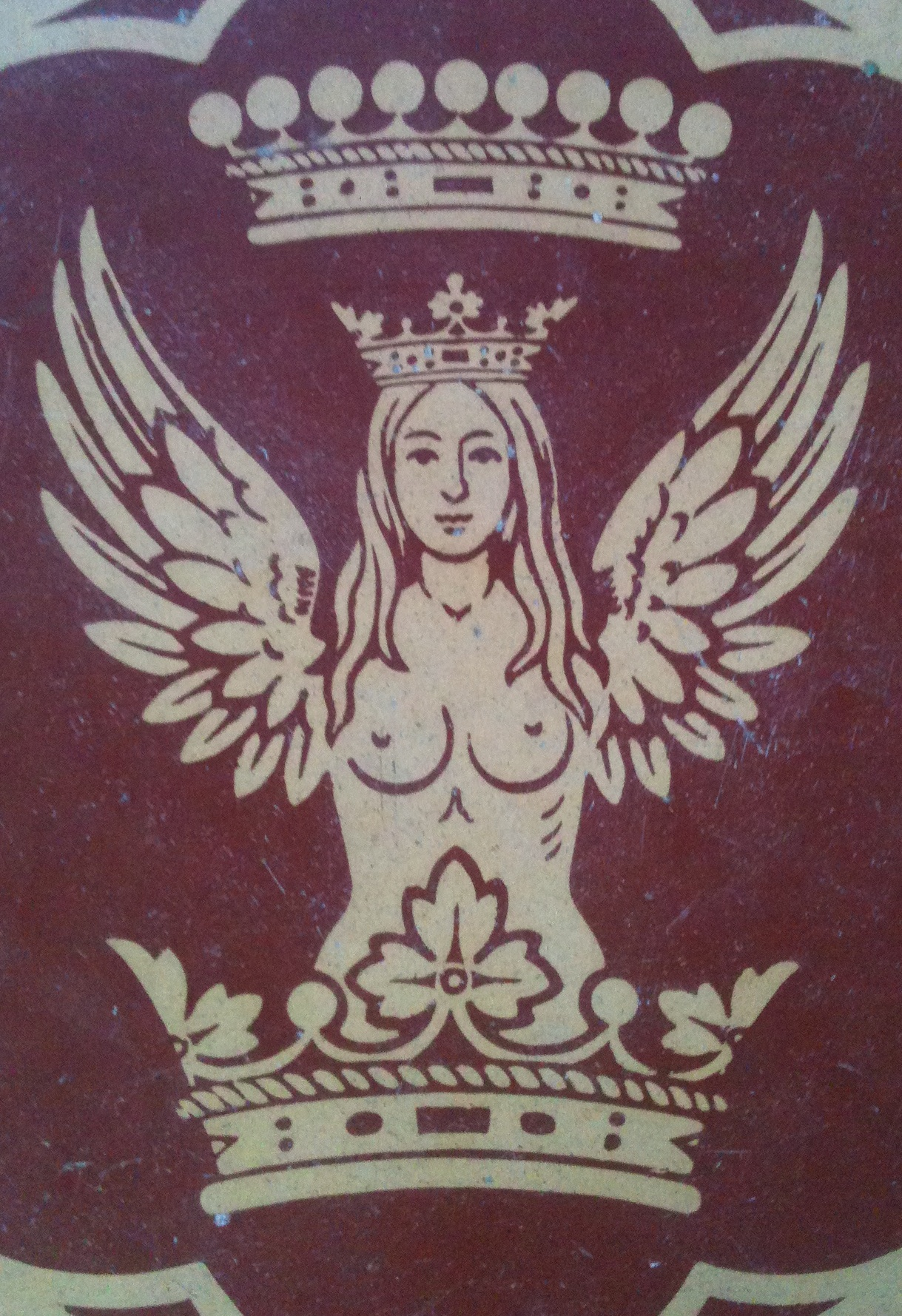

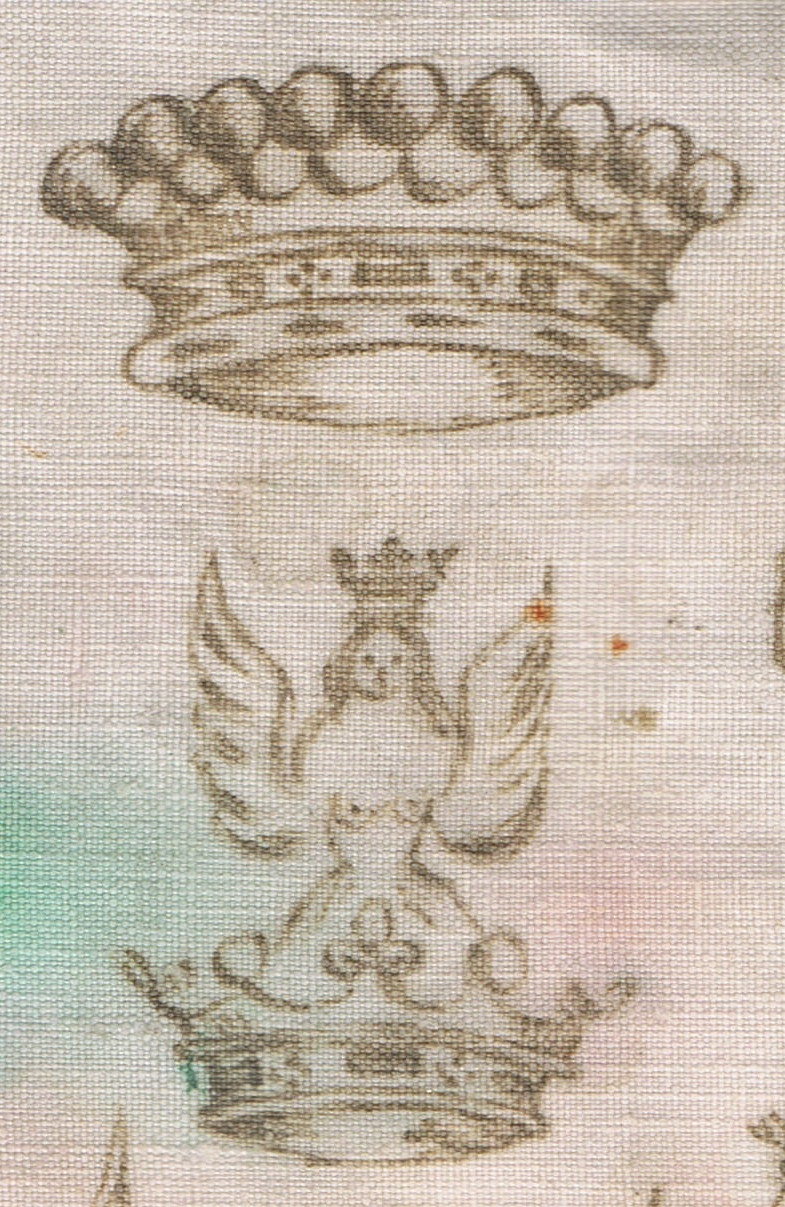

_{(This page concentrates on the senior line, (the anglicised primogenitive interpretation of the patent). Elsewhere, the 'category' below and disambiguation page De Salis, there are others within the purlieu of the 1748 creation).}
