= Basildon, Berkshire =

Coordinates: 51°29′49″N 1°08′13″W

Basildon
- Civil parish
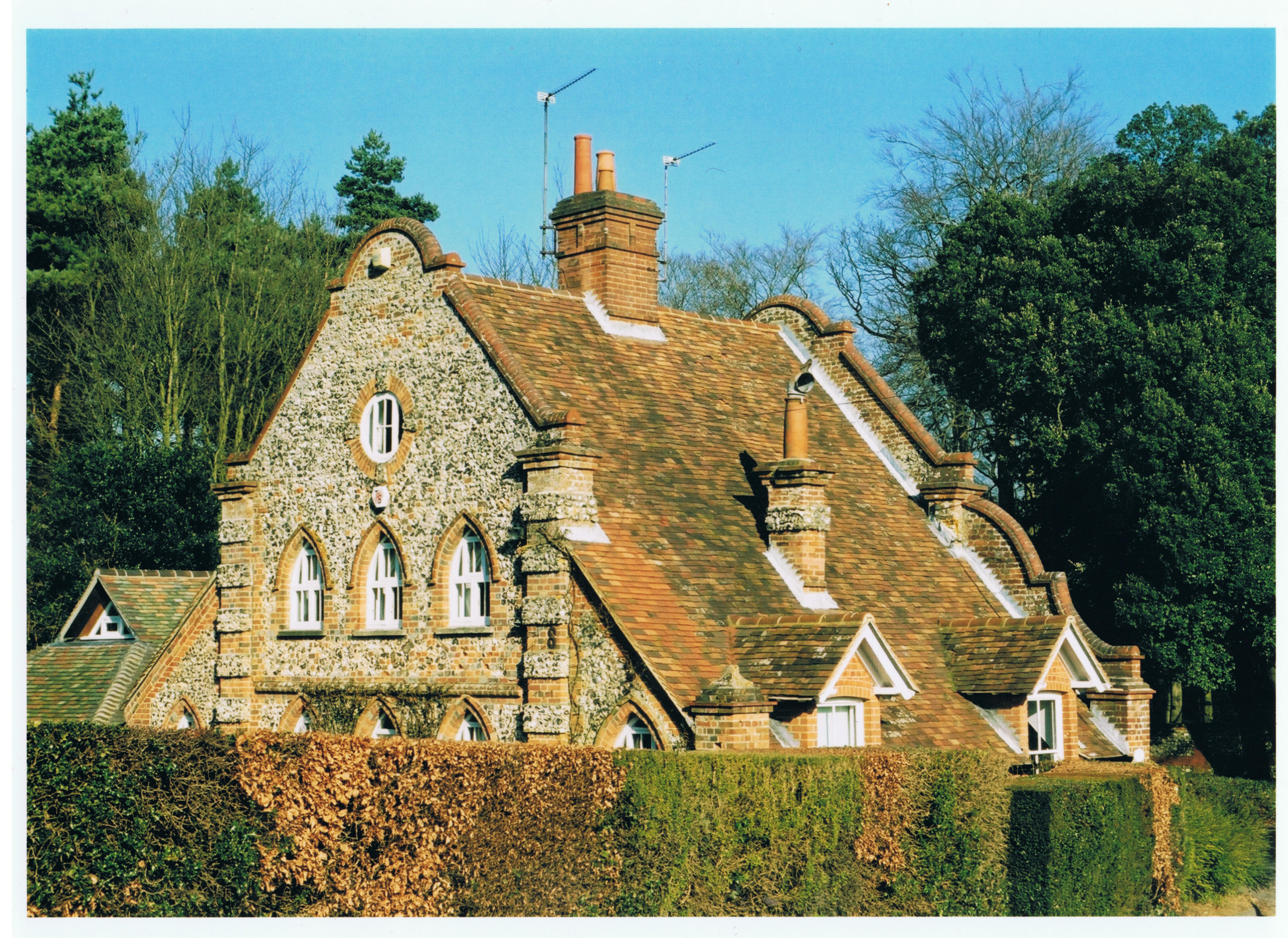
- Godwins Lodge, c. 2002

- Location within Berkshire
- Area: 13.67 km^{2} (5.28 sq mi)
- Population: 1,767 (2011 census)
  - Density: 129/km^{2} (330/sq mi)
- OS grid reference: SU599779
- Civil parish: Basildon
- Unitary authority: West Berkshire
- Ceremonial county: Berkshire
- Region: South East
- Country: England
- Sovereign state: United Kingdom
- Post town: READING
- Postcode district: RG8
- Dialling code: 0118/01491
- Police: Thames Valley
- Fire: Royal Berkshire
- Ambulance: South Central
- UK Parliament: Reading West and Mid Berkshire

Basildon is a civil parish in the English county of Berkshire. It comprises the small villages of Upper Basildon and Lower Basildon, named for their respective heights above the River Thames.

== Geography ==
Basildon is 7 miles (11 km) from Reading, 47 miles (76 km) from London and 20 miles (32 km) from Oxford. The parish is bordered to the north by the River Thames and the Oxfordshire parishes of Goring and Whitchurch-on-Thames on the other side of the river. To the south of the river it is bordered by the parishes of Pangbourne, Bradfield, Ashampstead and Streatley. The parish forms part of the unitary authority of West Berkshire. It is within the Newbury parliamentary constituency.

== Etymology ==
The name is derived from the Saxon and appears as Besllisford in a charter of 699 and as Baslidene in the Domesday Book. The main Basildon manor was mentioned in the Domesday Book of 1086 as Bastedene.

== History ==
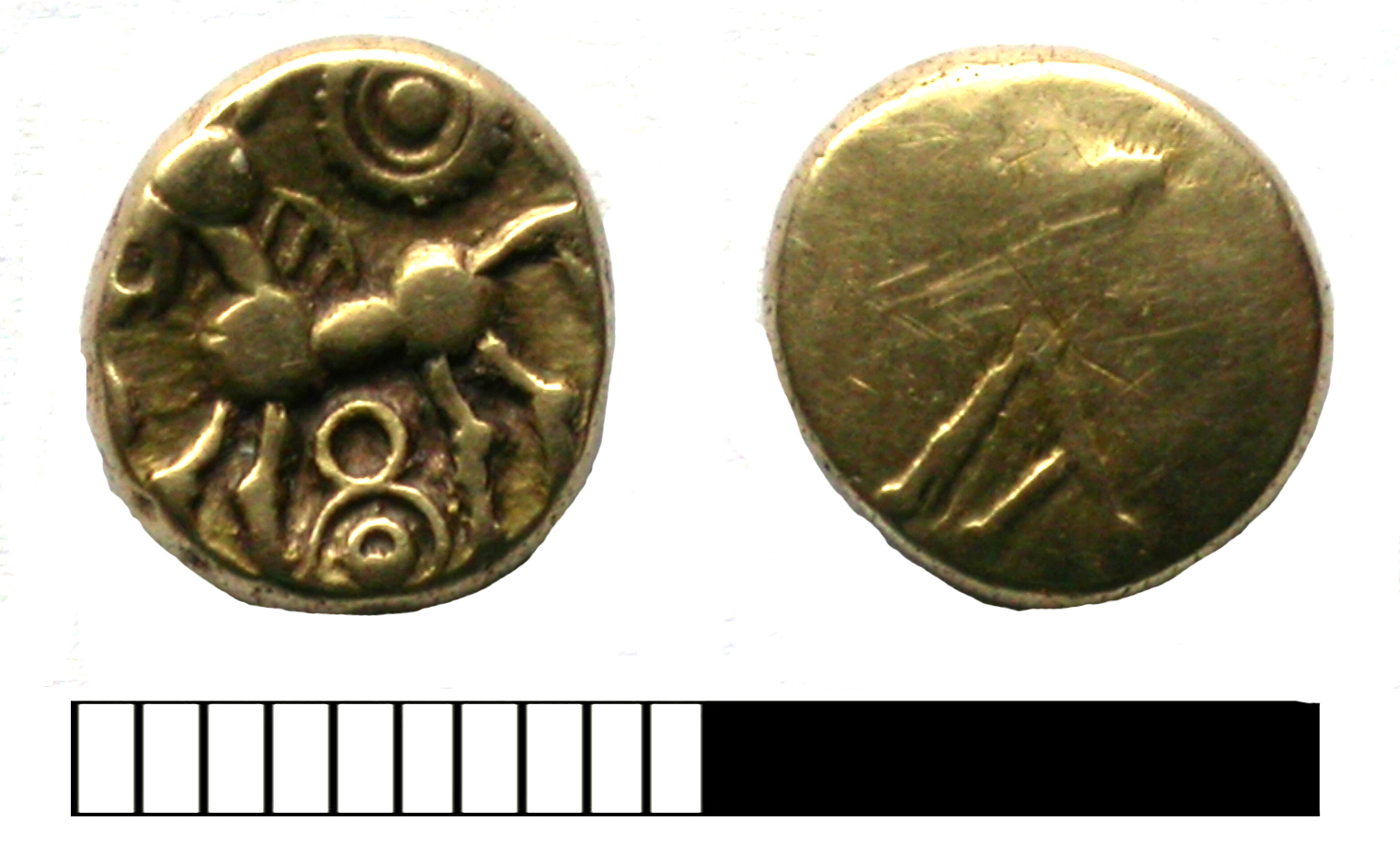
A gold Iron Age quarter stater coin from the reign of Commius, found in Basildon in 2013 and dated to c. 50 – c. 25 BCE

Ancient flint axes have been found in Basildon but the earliest physical remains to be seen today are two Bronze Age ditch sections called Grim's Ditch (circa 2,400 BC). The Romans built a road through the parish between Silchester to Dorchester-on-Thames and a wealthy Romano-Briton erected a farm and villa alongside this. It was discovered and destroyed when Brunel's Great Western Railway was built through it in 1838. The ancient parish of Basildon with five manors covered the present civil parishes of both Basildon and Ashampstead. Before the Norman Conquest the manor of Basildon was held by a free woman named Aileva.

In 1349, many of the local populace died from the Black Death. The parish remained the centre of a quiet agricultural community thereafter, slowly growing prosperous. From the 17th century, it was the location of Basildon House, the country seat of the Fane family who later also built the Grotto in Lower Basildon, near the Thames. The present house was built and the park laid out for Sir Francis Sykes in 1776. The history of the village then largely followed the fortunes of the estate owners. J. M. W. Turner stayed at Basildon Park and since he painted "Rain, Steam and Speed" in 1844, this painting has sometimes been said to show the Basildon railway bridge which stands in the valley below the house. However, it is generally accepted as showing the Maidenhead Railway Bridge.

Nobes' Tomb (or mausoleum) is located near Tomb Farm in Upper Basildon. It is now a ruin, but was regarded at one stage as being cursed, with any man who destroyed Nobes' grave being cursed. In the early 20th century, the expression "There goes Nobes on his white horse!" was commonly used. A second ghost is Nan Carey, who haunts Nan Carey's Hill, a cross roads at Upper Basildon.

In old times, Basildon Revel was held from the 20th-25th July on Upper Basildon Green.

== Education ==
Basildon primary school, founded in 1875, is located in Upper Basildon and provides education for about 140 children. Secondary education is provided primarily by Theale Green School, 6 miles away in Theale.

== Amenities ==
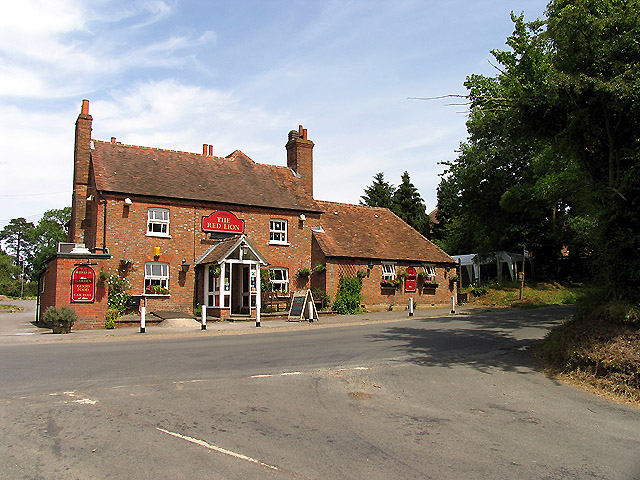
The Intersection at the Red Lion

=== Beale Park ===
Beale Park is a 40-acre outdoor wildlife park located between Basildon Park and the River Thames.

== Transport ==
Reading Buses bus service 43 (Reading to Upper Basildon via Pangbourne) serves Basildon.

== Notable buildings ==
=== Churches ===
The parish has two churches. The Grade I listed St Bartholomew's Church in Lower Basildon dates from the 13th Century and is now owned and maintained by the Churches Conservation Trust. The churchyard is notable as the resting place of Jethro Tull, the 18th century agriculturalist, whose modern gravestone can be seen there. St Stephen's in Upper Basildon was built in 1964. This replaced the temporary place of worship, located on the corner of Bethesda Street and Blandy's Lane, which was built in 1895.

=== Basildon Park ===
The National Trust property of Basildon Park, built by John Carr of York between 1776 and 1783 for Sir Francis Sykes, one of the East India Company nabobs, is situated between Lower Basildon and Upper Basildon. His grandson dissipated his fortune and so mistreated his wife that he ended up caricatured as Bill Sikes in Charles Dickens’s Oliver Twist. In 1838, the estate was sold to businessman, James Morrison and his family held it until 1929. The Morrison family built up an art collection which included works by Constable, Da Vinci, Hogarth, Holbein, Poussin, Rembrandt, Reynolds, Rubens, Titian, Turner and Van Dyck. Part of the surviving collection hangs at Sudeley Castle in Gloucestershire, where their descendants live.

== Demography ==
2011 Published Statistics: Population, home ownership and extracts from Physical Environment, surveyed in 2005
Output area	Homes owned outright	Owned with a loan	Socially rented	Privately rented	Other	km^{2} roads	km^{2} water	km^{2} domestic gardens	Usual residents	km^{2}
Civil parish	251	286	50	62	17	0.2	0.3	0.7	1767	13.7

== Notable people ==
Upper Basildon was the place of birth (1674) and Lower Basildon the place of burial (1741) of Jethro Tull, the English agricultural pioneer who helped bring about the British Agricultural Revolution. Other notable Basildonians include:

- Charles Fane, 1st Viscount Fane
- Charles Fane, 2nd Viscount Fane
- George Fane
- Sir Henry Fane
- Captain Allen Francis Gardiner, the missionary pioneer, who started the first missionary station at Port Natal, Zululand and co-founded the City of Durban in South Africa.
- Elspeth Hanson
- Langton Iliffe, 2nd Baron Iliffe
- Dorothy Montagu, Countess of Sandwich
- James Morrison and his son, Charles Morrison, merchant banker, and grandson James Morrison, politician.
- Sir Francis Sykes, 1st Baronet

== Legacy ==
The British stationery company, Basildon Bond founded in 1911, is named after Basildon, taking its name when some of the directors fell to liking the alliteration of "Basildon" and "bond" whilst holidaying at Basildon Park, at the time owned by Major James Archibald Morrison.
