= Basildon (disambiguation) =

Basildon is a town in Essex, England.

Basildon may also refer to:

== Places in England ==
- In Essex:
  - Basildon (district), a local government district
  - Basildon (UK Parliament constituency)
- In Berkshire:
  - Basildon, Berkshire, a parish
  - Lower Basildon
  - Upper Basildon
  - Basildon Park, a country house in Lower Basildon

== People ==
- Angela Smith, Baroness Smith of Basildon
- Basildon Peta, Zimbabwean journalist and publisher
- Nigel Bond, a snooker player nicknamed "Basildon"

== Other ==
- SS Basildon, a coaster

== See also ==
- Basildon Bond, a stationery brand
- Basildon railway station
