= Viscount Fane =

Title in the Peerage of Ireland

Viscount Fane was a title in the Peerage of Ireland. It was created on 22 April 1718 for the politician and courtier Charles Fane. He was made Baron of Loughguyre, in the County of Limerick, at the same time, also in the Peerage of Ireland. Fane was the second son of Sir Henry Fane, only son of the Honourable George Fane, fifth son of Francis Fane, 1st Earl of Westmorland (see Earl of Westmorland for earlier history of the family). He was succeeded by his son, the second Viscount. He was a politician and diplomat. The titles became extinct on his death in 1766, though his widow lived on until 1792, and the De Salis were later to add the name and arms of Fane to their own surname (Royal Licence 1809 and 1835).

The Fane's Basildon estate in Berkshire was then sold while the more profitable ones in counties Armagh and Limerick were later partitioned between sons of the surviving co-heiresses of the last Lord Fane, Peter de Salis and the 5th Earl of Sandwich. In honour of this inheritance the De Salis added Fane to their name, by Royal Licence in 1809 and 1835.

== Viscounts Fane (1718) ==
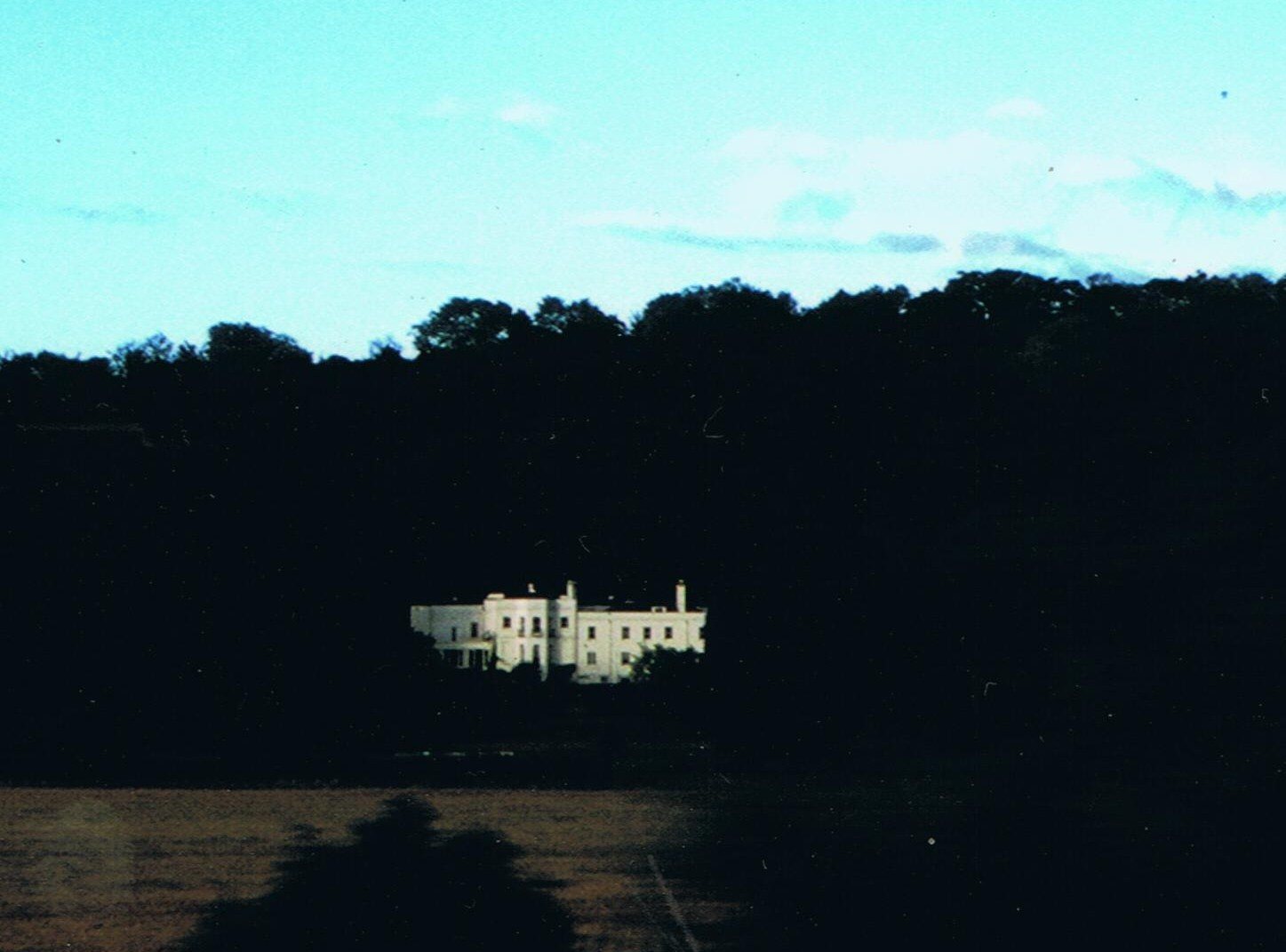
The Fane's New House at Basildon, where Mary, Viscountess Fane built her grotto. (Photo:2007).

- Charles Fane, 1st Viscount Fane (1676–1744)
- Charles Fane, 2nd Viscount Fane (c. 1708–1766)

== See also ==
- Earl of Westmorland
- Count de Salis-Soglio
