= Charles Fane, 1st Viscount Fane =

Anglo-Irish courtier, politician and a landowner

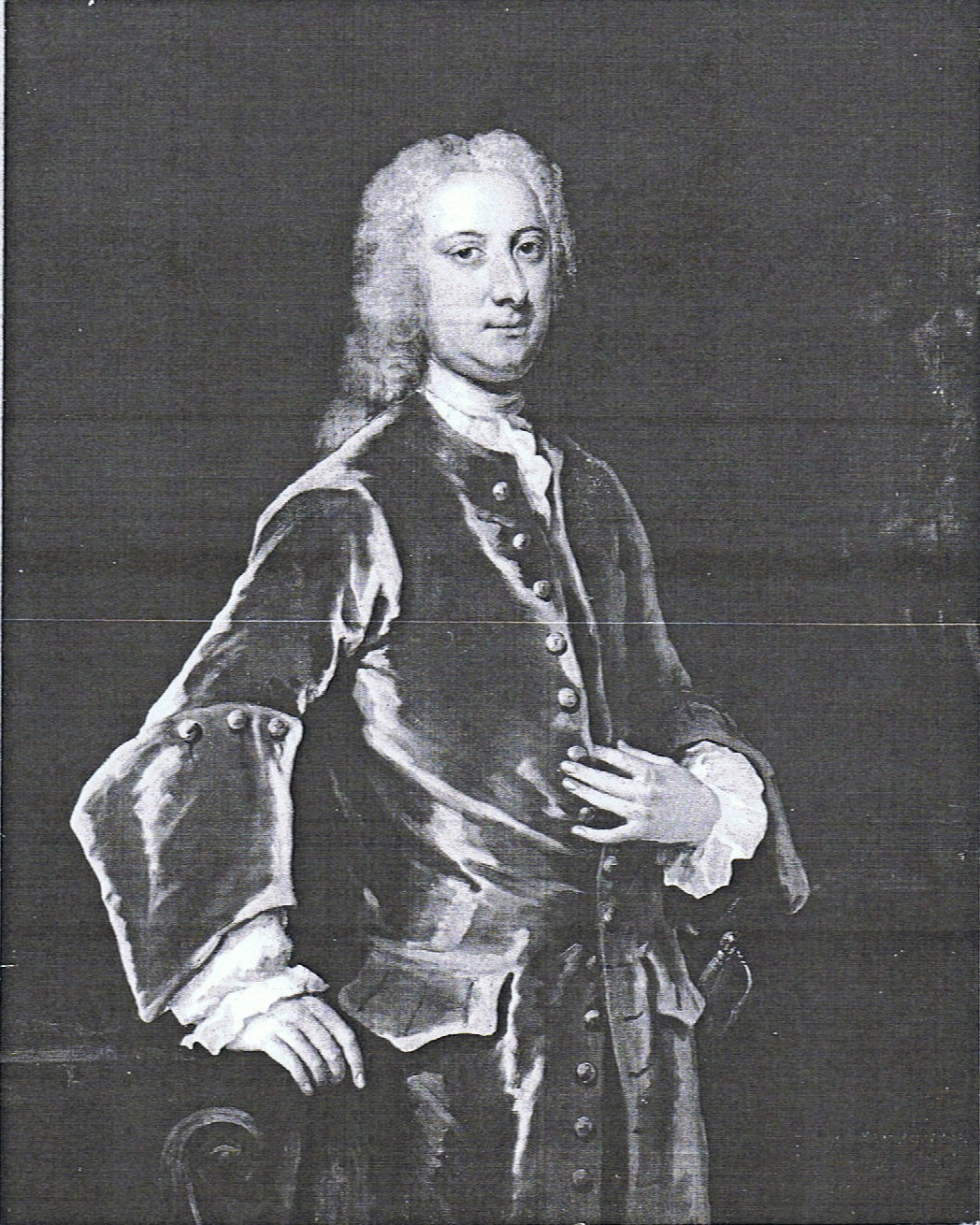
Charles Fane by John Vanderbank, c1720s.

Charles Fane, 1st Viscount Fane PC (Ire) (January 1676 – 4 July 1744) was an Anglo-Irish courtier, politician and a landowner in both England and Ireland.

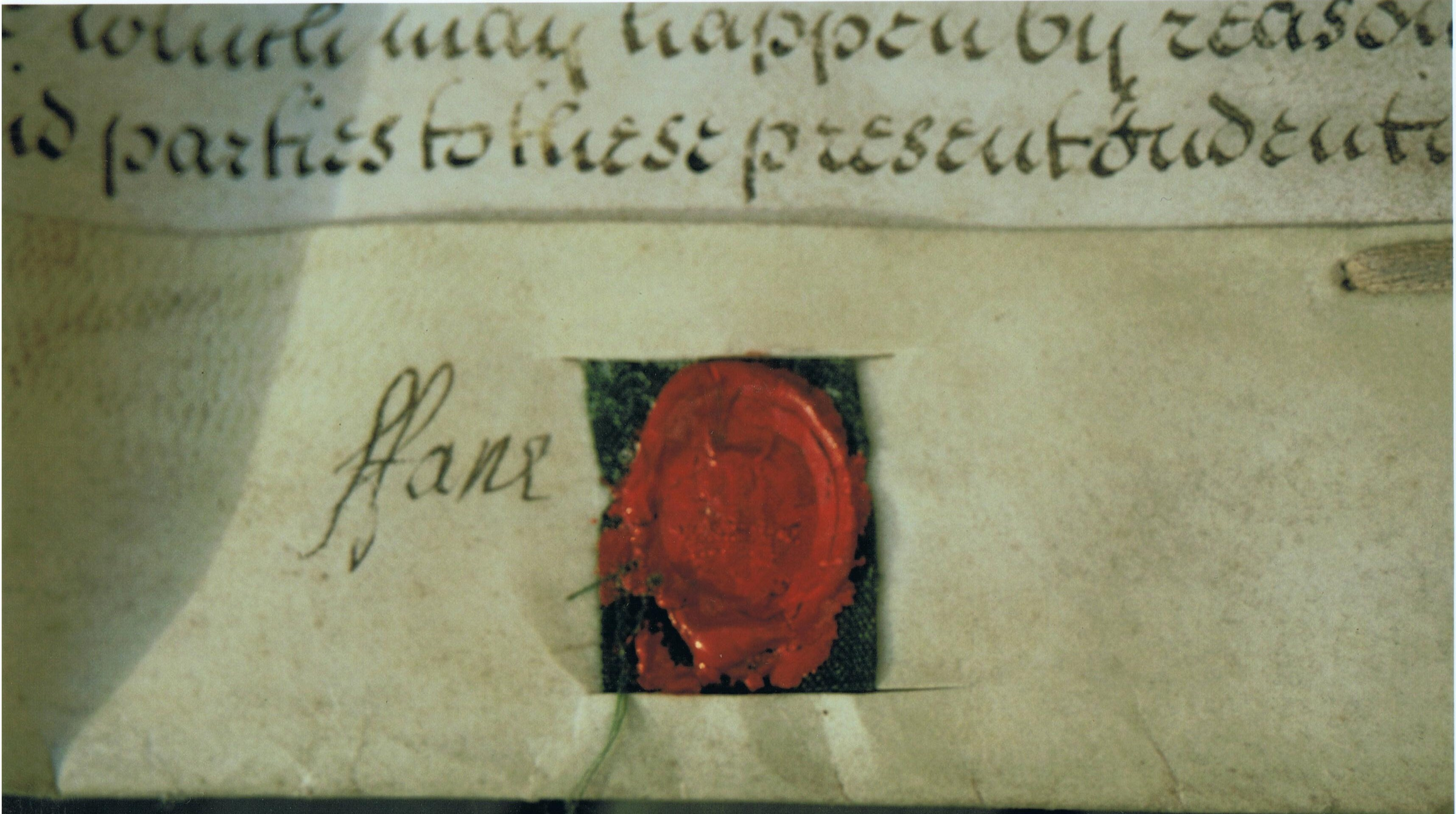
_{Fane's signature on his daughter Mary's Marriage Settlement, 1734}

Fane was baptised at Basildon in Berkshire on 30 January 1676, he was the second son but heir of the Right Hon. Sir Henry Fane, of Basildon, KB, (1650–1705/06), by his wife Elizabeth, daughter of Thomas Southcott of Exeter.

== Family ==
His elder brother's death made him eventual heir to the Bourchier estates; the manors of Lough Gur and Glenogra in county Limerick and of Clare, near Tandragee, in county Armagh; to the Fane estate at Basildon in Berkshire; and to the Southcott estate at Calwoodley in Devon.

The elder brother Henry Bourchier Fane was Standard Bearer of the Gentlemen Pensioners from 10 April 1689 until early 1696 when he was killed as a result of a duel (Sunday 12 April 1696 at Leicester Fields), by Elizeus Burges (c. 1670–1736), (later that year he also killed Hildebrand Horden in a brawl. Nineteen years later he almost became Governor of the province of Massachusetts Bay, he did not take up the appointment but was instead British Resident in Venice, 1719–1722 and 1727–1736).

Having left Wadham College, Oxford (he had matriculated 3 April 1693, fil. eq. de Balneo natu minor. Taken up for Battels, 21 January 1702/03) Fane duly replaced his unfortunate elder brother as Standard Bearer from 20 April 1696, a post he had vacated by 31 March 1712.

Meanwhile, his younger brother George Fane had become Commander of the Royal ship the Lowestoffe, (a 5th rate, 104.5 x 28-foot (8.5 m) ship built at Chatham dockyard in 1697). Appointed Captain in 1709, he died without issue at New York the same year.

== Political career ==
Fane was appointed Deputy Lieutenant (DL) for Berkshire, 21 September 1715. He was Member of the Irish Parliament (MP) for Killybegs in county Donegal, a seat controlled by the Conygham family, from 1715 to 1719.

On 22 April 1718 he was created Baron of Loughguyre, in the county of Limerick, and Viscount Fane, both in the Peerage of Ireland, and number 264 on the roll. He took his seat seven years later on 21 April 1725, having been appointed to the Irish Privy Council on 5 May 1718. Fane's Irish peerage, though no doubt well deserved, must have been helped along by his soldier-statesman brother-in-law James Stanhope, who had become First Lord of the Treasury in 1717, been created Baron Stanhope of Elvaston and Viscount Stanhope of Mahon on 3 July 1717, returned to his former office of Secretary of State for the Southern Department in 1718, having been further elevated, to Earl, just eight days before Fane, on 14 April 1718.

He stood unsuccessfully for Berkshire in the election of 30 August 1727. At the poll Fane (1319 votes) was beaten into third place by Robert Packer (1620 votes) and Sir John Stonhouse (1558 votes).

== His wife ==
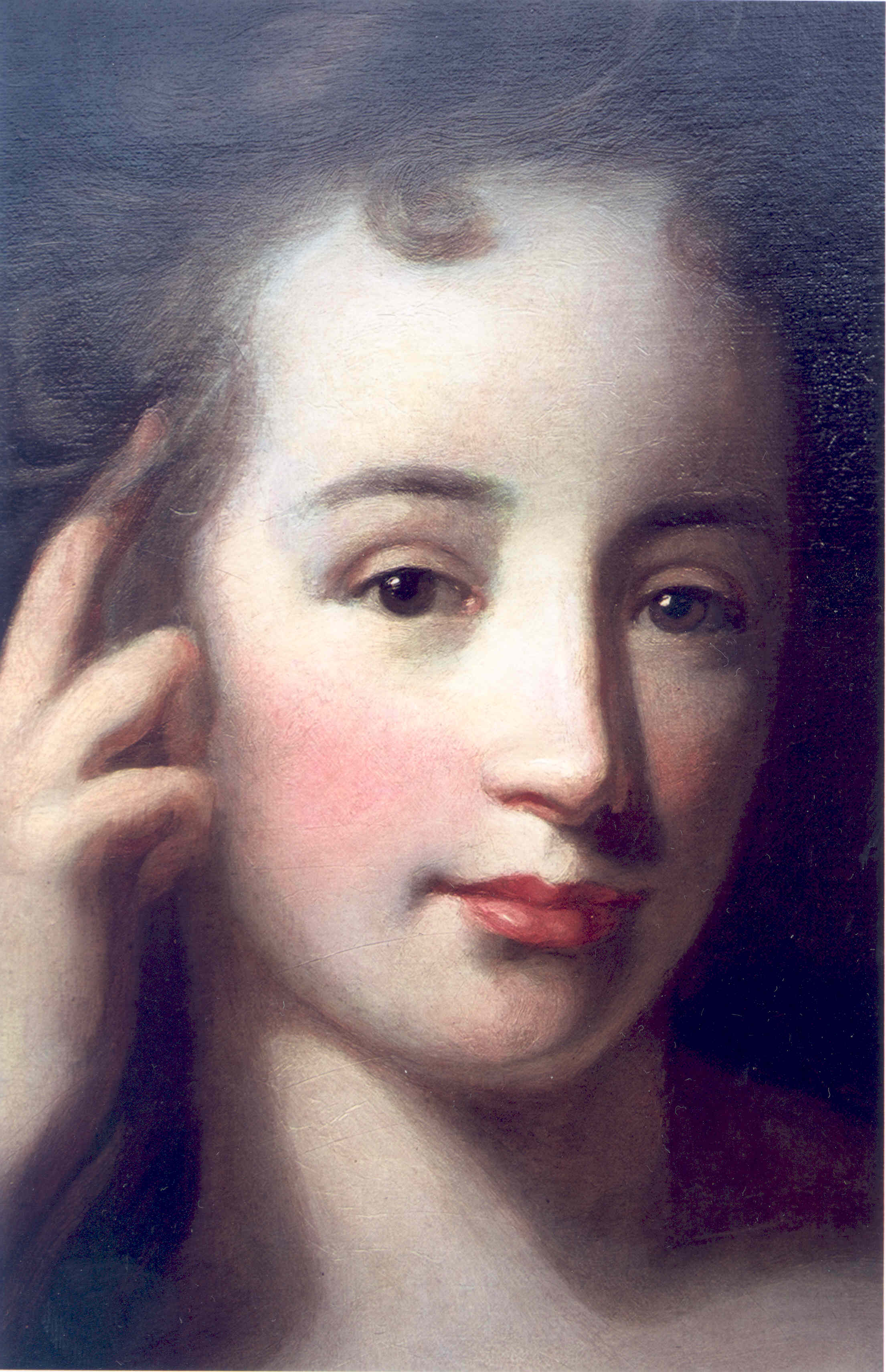
Lady Fane, detail of a portrait by Godfried Schalcken, 1702. The prime version of this painting is at Chevening.

Fane married at the Chelsea Hospital, 12 December 1707 (license dated 19 November 1707), Mary (1686–1762) daughter of the envoy hon. Alexander Stanhope, FRS, (the youngest son of the first Earl of Chesterfield), by Catherine (d.1718), daughter and co-heir of Arnold Burghill, of Thingehill Parva, Withington, Herefordshire by his second wife Grizell, co-heir of John Prise of Ocle Pyrchard, Herefordshire. A sister of soldier-statesman James, Earl Stanhope (1673–1721), Mary Fane was also an old friend of the Mistress of the Robes, Sarah Churchill, Duchess of Marlborough, (coincidentally, the Duchess was a fourth cousin of Mary Stanhope's future husband, Charles Fane, the common ancestor being Walter Mildmay), having been one of the six original Maids of Honour to Queen Anne, appointed 4 June 1702, an office she had vacated by November 1707.

An indenture of settlement dated 19 November 1707 between Charles Fane of Basildon and others, had her marriage portion at 3,000 L (pounds). Robert Walpole, the husband of Mary's first cousin twice-removed (through the Stanhope family) Catherine Shorter (c.1682–1737) aka cousin Walpole, was a witness. (Philip Stanhope, 1st Earl of Chesterfield's daughter Elizabeth's granddaughter Elizabeth Philipps married Sir John Shorter).

Fane died 7 July 1744 and was buried at Basildon 16 July 1744, aged 68. His widow died 21 and was buried at Basildon on 30 August 1762, aged 76. They had seven children.

- Charles, 2nd Viscount Fane;
- Mary who married Jerome, 2nd Count de Salis;
- Elizabeth of Windsor (1711–1760);
- Dorothy Fane who married John Montagu, 4th Earl of Sandwich;
- Charlotte of Chelsea (1718–1765), (& c1751, of 10, Old Burlington Street);
- and two who died as children, Lucy (1713-1714) and James (b. 1714-1729).

From 1751 to 1758 Mary, Viscountess Fane lived at No. 2, Swan Walk, Chelsea, London (built 1711–1712).

In a letter to Horace Mann, from Strawberry Hill, dated Sunday, 29 August 1762, Horace Walpole ended his long epistle: PS. When I was mentioning acquaintance you have lost, I forgot to name Lady Fane; you see nervous disorders are not very mortal; I think she must have been above seventy.

== Grotto ==
In the 1720s and 30s she built the sometime renowned Grotto at the Fane's New House by the Thames at Lower Basildon, but in the parish of Streatley in Berkshire.

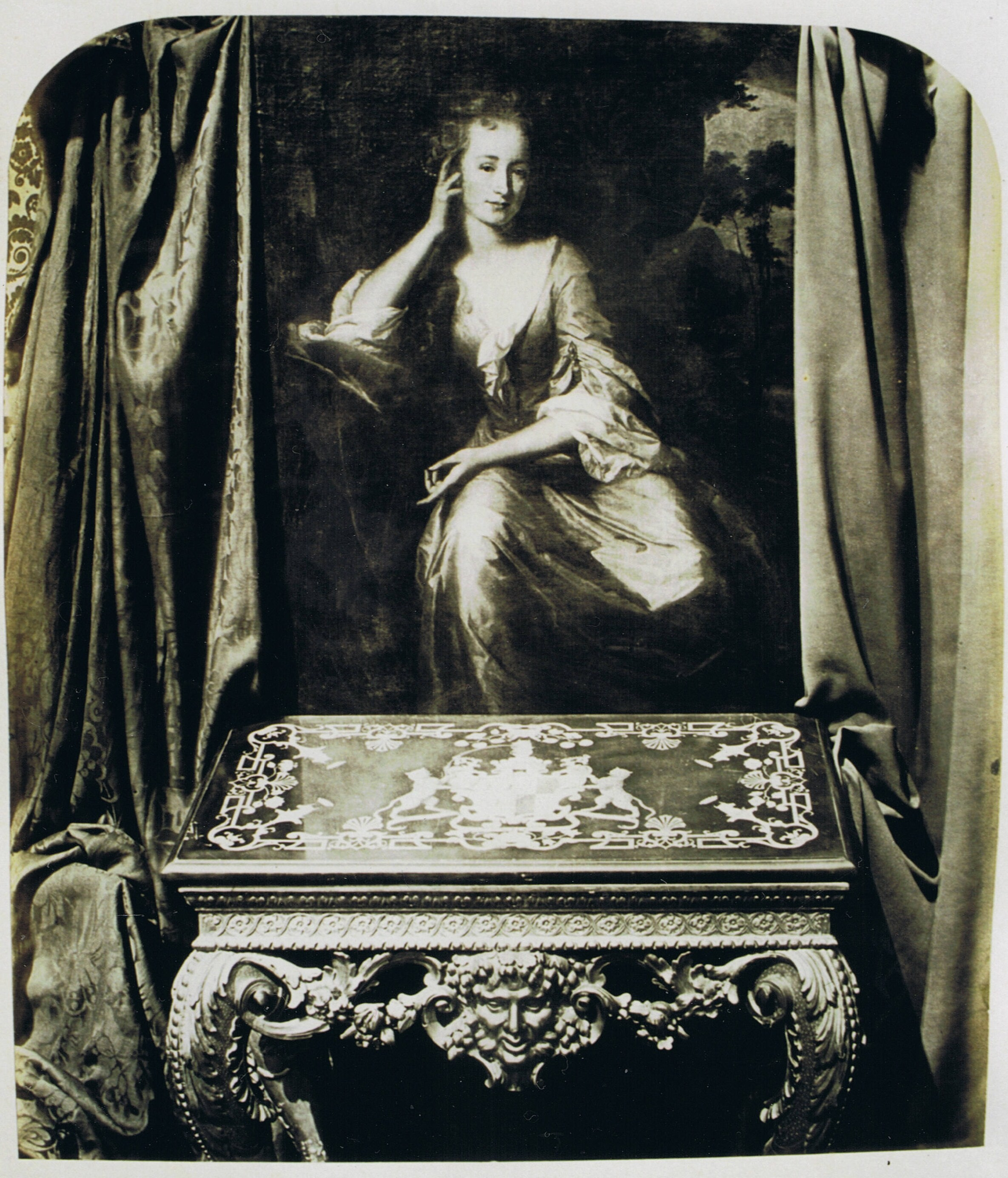
Victorian photo of a portrait of Lady Fane, by G. Schalken, 1702, and Florentine table c1735.

These extracts show some of the process:

Lady Fane in London, writing to her husband at Basildon, on April ye 1st / 1731:

...I desire to have
notice of the first barge that comes to town
I hope you received the things I sent last week
3 pairs of andirons 6 pairs of blankets three hampers
of empty bottles some stones and shells which
were directed to be left att the new house and
the painted cloaths which are to cost a vast
sum of mony.

— Lady Fane.

And to her husband, this time from Florence, November 1736:

..when I go home I shall finish my Grotto as fast as possible
and then I shall want to make a door in that little place.

— Lord Fane.

Her son, Charles, was appointed British Resident (Horace Walpole's friend Sir Horace Mann was his assistant then successor as Resident) in Florence in March 1734 and was there in person between 3 October 1734 and the Spring of 1738. Lady Fane and her daughter Dorothy were there with him from June 1736. Dorothy stayed until at least June 1737, this extract from a letter to Lady Fane suggests that the mother too was there for a year:

Sarah, Duchess of Marlborough, from Wimbledon, to Lady Fane, 23 September 1737:

... I am glad to find that you have had the pleasure of passing
a whole year with your son

— Sarah, Duchess of Marlborough.

It is probable that during this trip Lady Fane ordered her pair of prized scagliola table tops from the Irishman Friar Ferdinando Henrico Hugford (1695–1771). These are quite similar to the one at The Vyne, Hampshire. That top has the arms of Walpole (with his post-1726 Garter Knight embellishments) impaling Shorter – for Prime Minister Sir Robert Walpole and his first wife Catherine Shorter, who died 20 August 1737. The hint of shells on the tables suggest that they may have been for her grotto at the New House, Basildon.

In 1747 the blue-stocking and fellow Berkshire-dweller Elizabeth Montagu (1720–1800) described the Fane grotto:

the situation is like most grottoes, placed where a grotto would not be looked for:
it joins to the house. Now having told its only defect, I will go on to the rest.
The first room is fitted up entirely with shells, the sides and ceilings in beautiful mosaic,
a rich cornice of flowers in baskets and cornucopias, and little yellow sea
snail is so disposed in shades as to resemble knots of ribbon which seem
to tye up some of the bunches of flowers.
There is a bed for the Hermit, which is composed of rich shells and so
shaded that the curtain seems folded and flowing...
the room adjoining it is rough work in a very bold taste,
the water falls down into a cold bath.
The grotto is about 50 yards from the Thames, to which the descent is very precipitate.
From the shell room you have a view of it.
The House to which this grotto is joined is a small habitation where
Lady Fane used to spend a good deal of time. Lord Fane's seat is about a mile from it.

— Elizabeth Montagu.

== Gallery ==
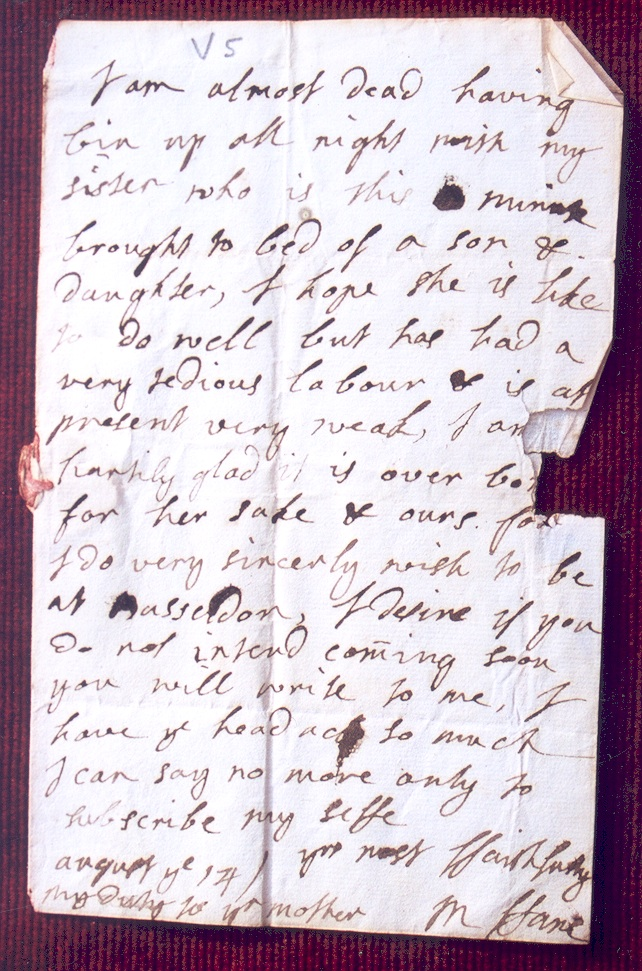
Mary Fane to her husband, reporting the birth of the future Philip, 2nd Earl Stanhope in August 1714.

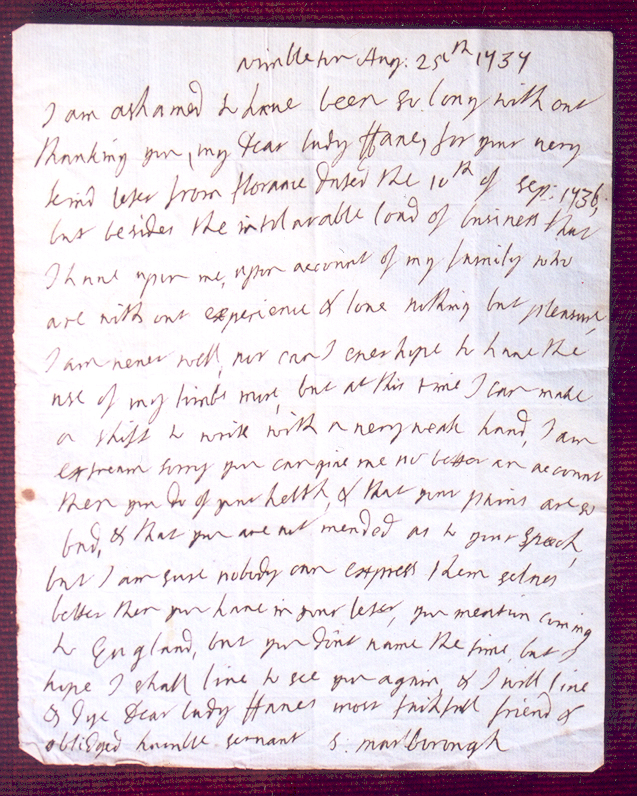
Letter from Sarah, Duchess of Marlborough to Lady Fane, 1737

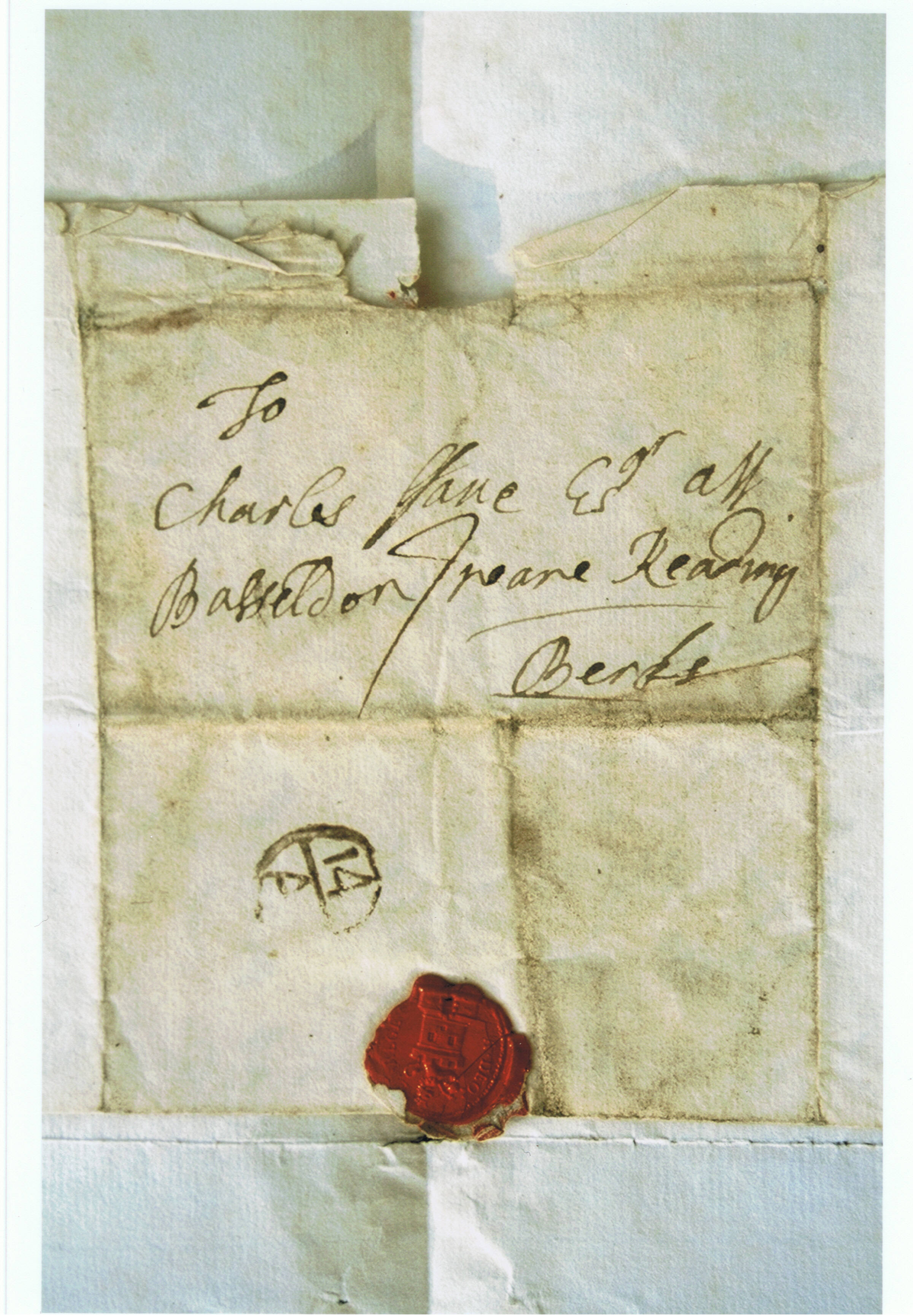
From his wife, with Stanhope seal.

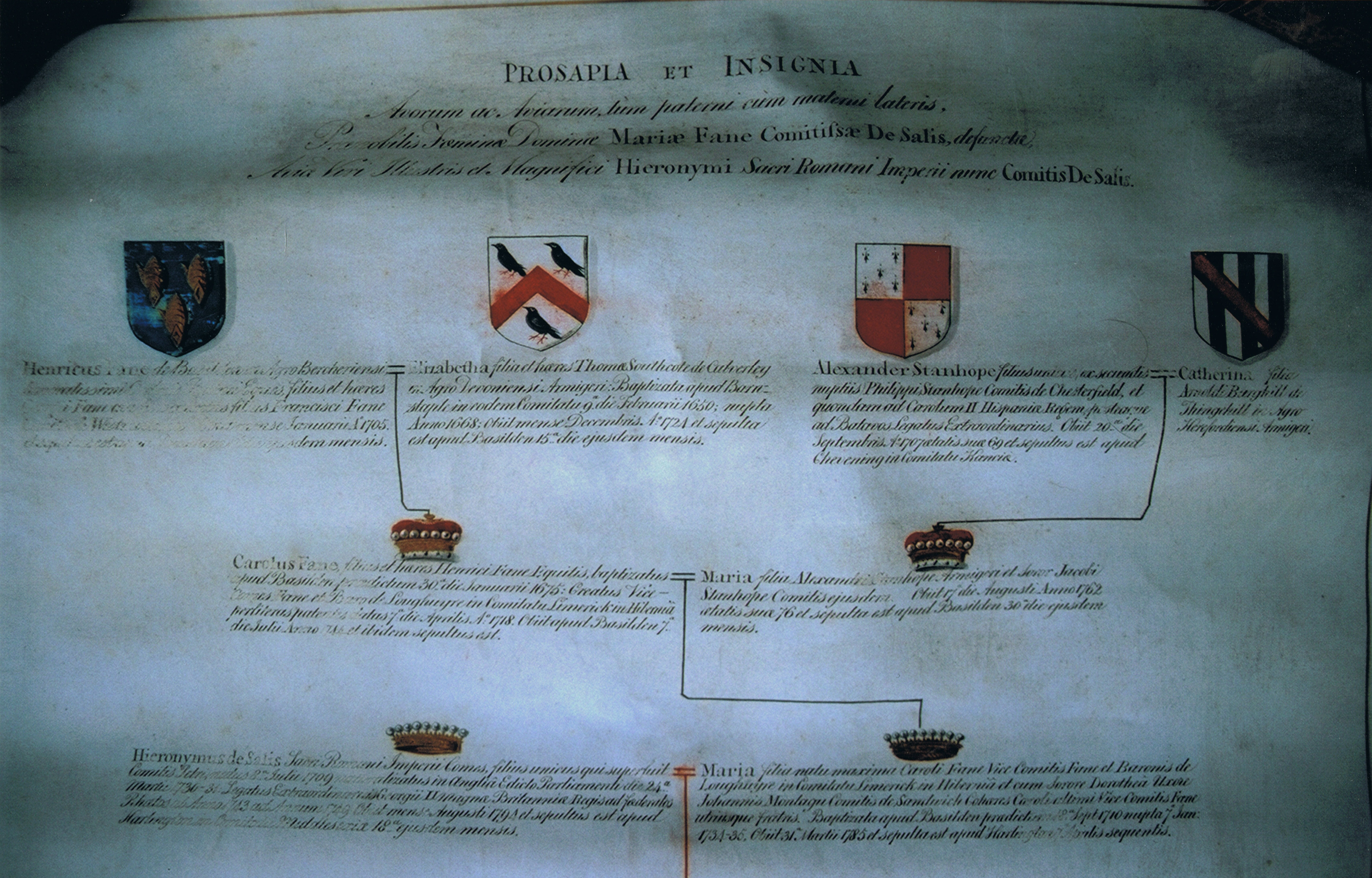
Prosapia and Insignia for Fane, Southcott, Stanhope and Burghill

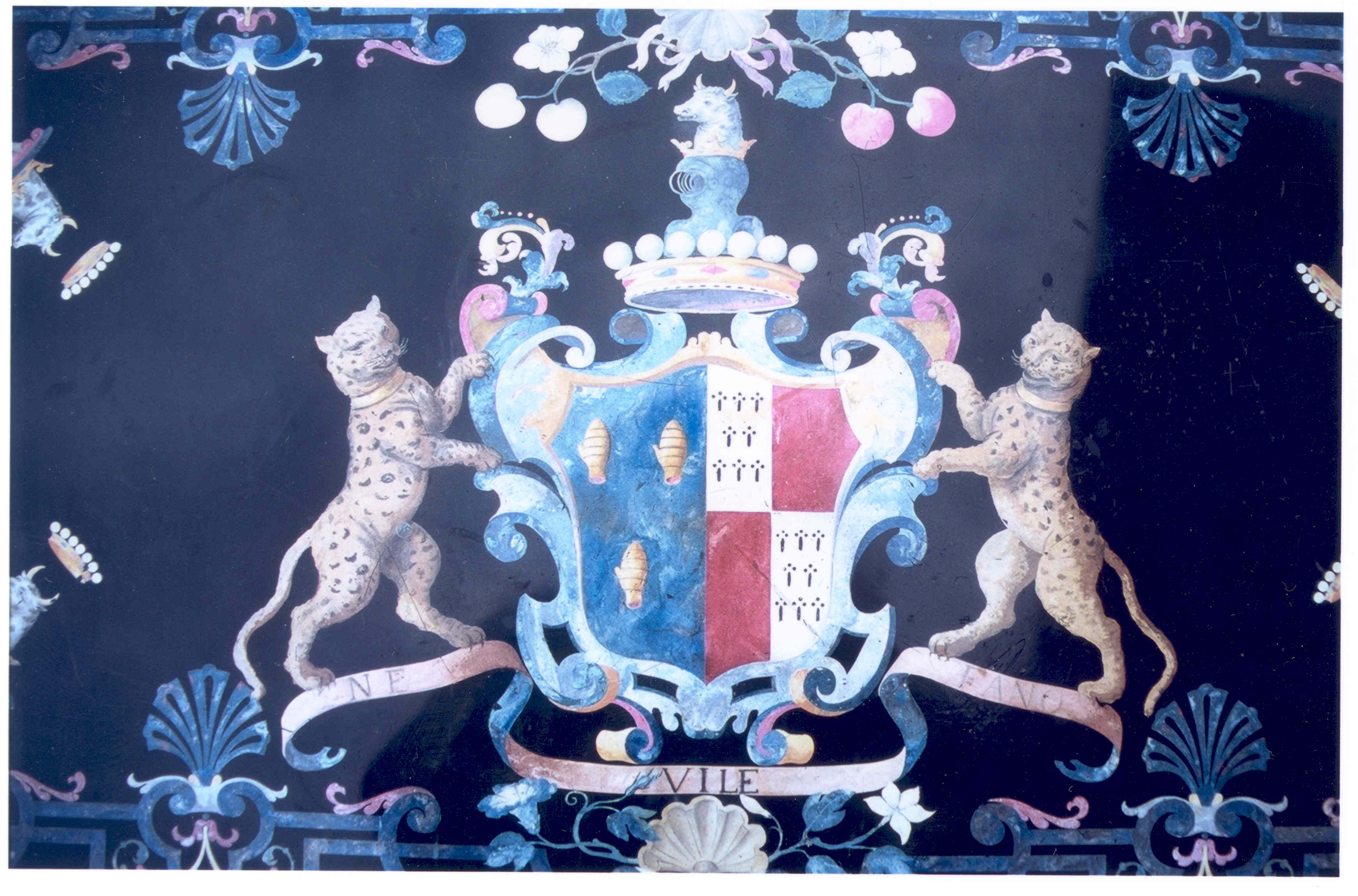
Florentine scagliola table top with arms of Fane impalling Stanhope, c. 1737.

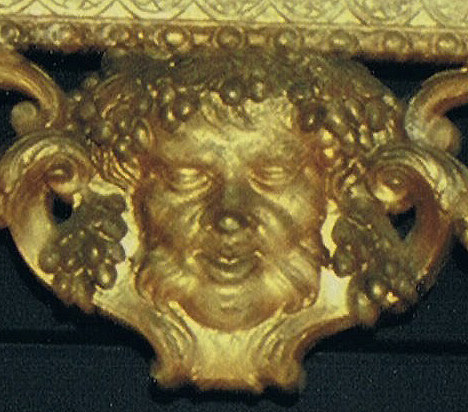
Detail of Bacchus on one of a pair of side-tables made for Lord Fane and/or his wife c. 1740 (part of the base for the scagliola). Possibly meant for the New House's Grotto at Basildon.

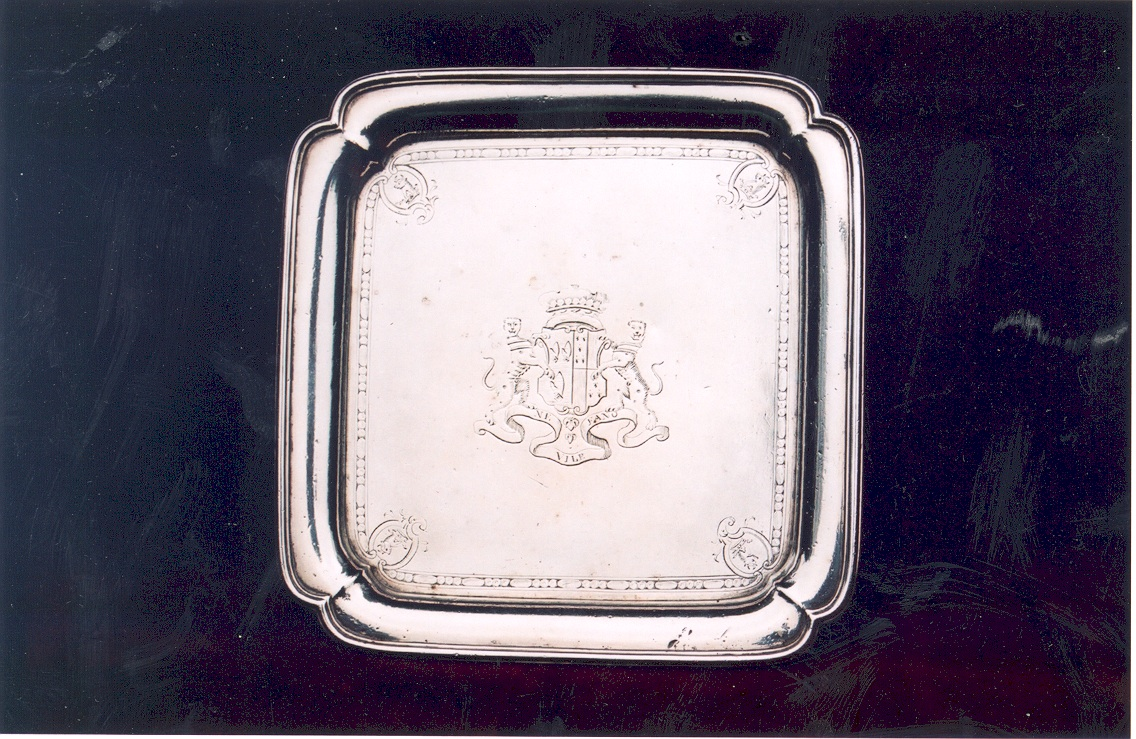
Britannia gauge silver waiter dated 1732, with Fane crests and arms of Fane impaling Stanhope. Maker, Paul de Lamerie.

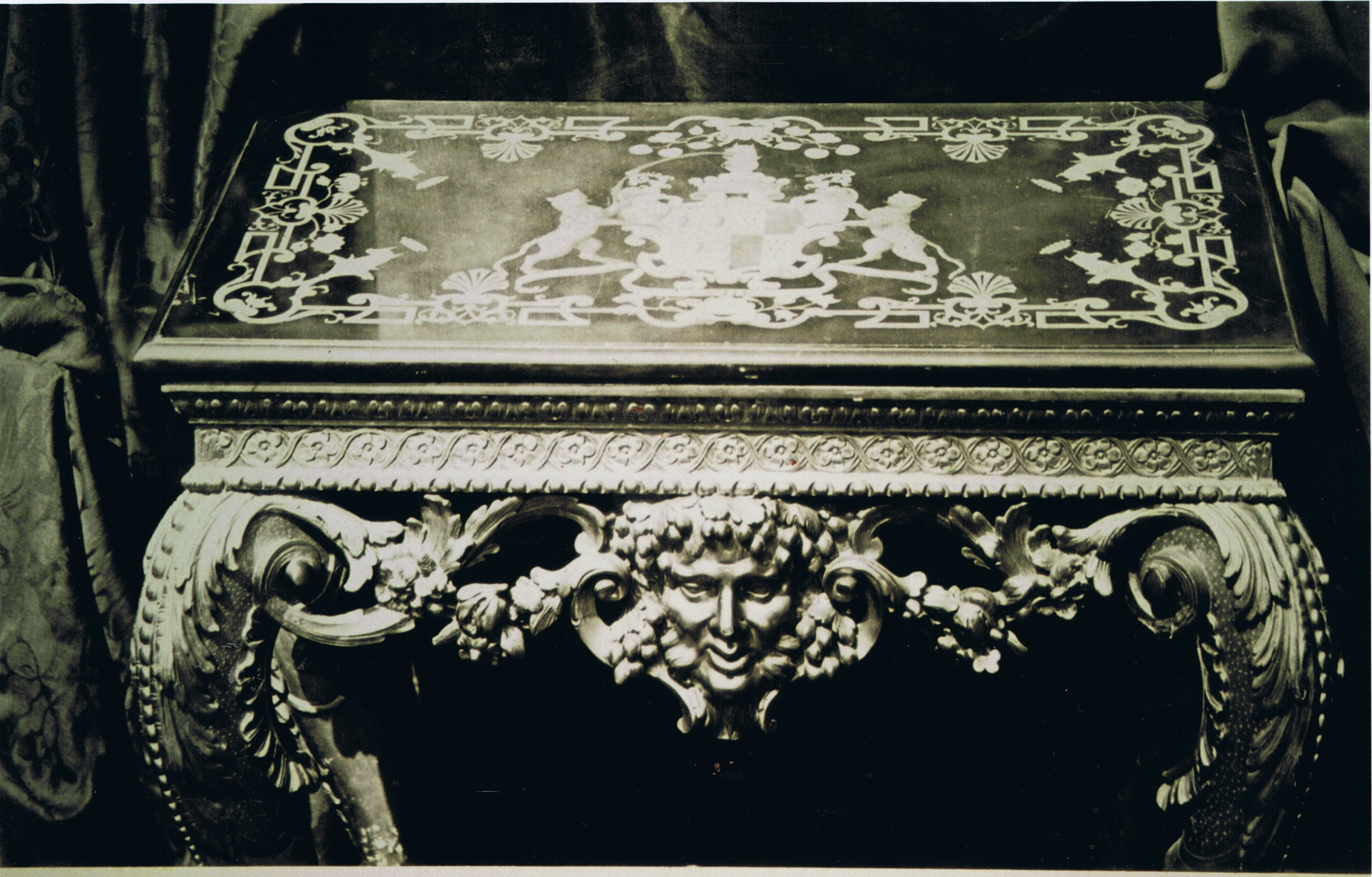
One of the pair of the Fanes' Florentine scagliola topped and British Bacchus masked and cabriole legged c. 1740 tables. This detail of a larger B/W photo was commissioned c. 1870.

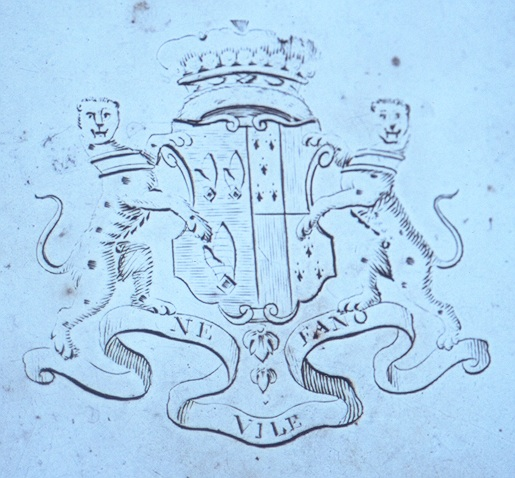
Coat of arms on a silver waiter dated 1732, showing arms of Fane impaling Stanhope, for Charles Fane and his wife Mary, possibly a 25th wedding present.

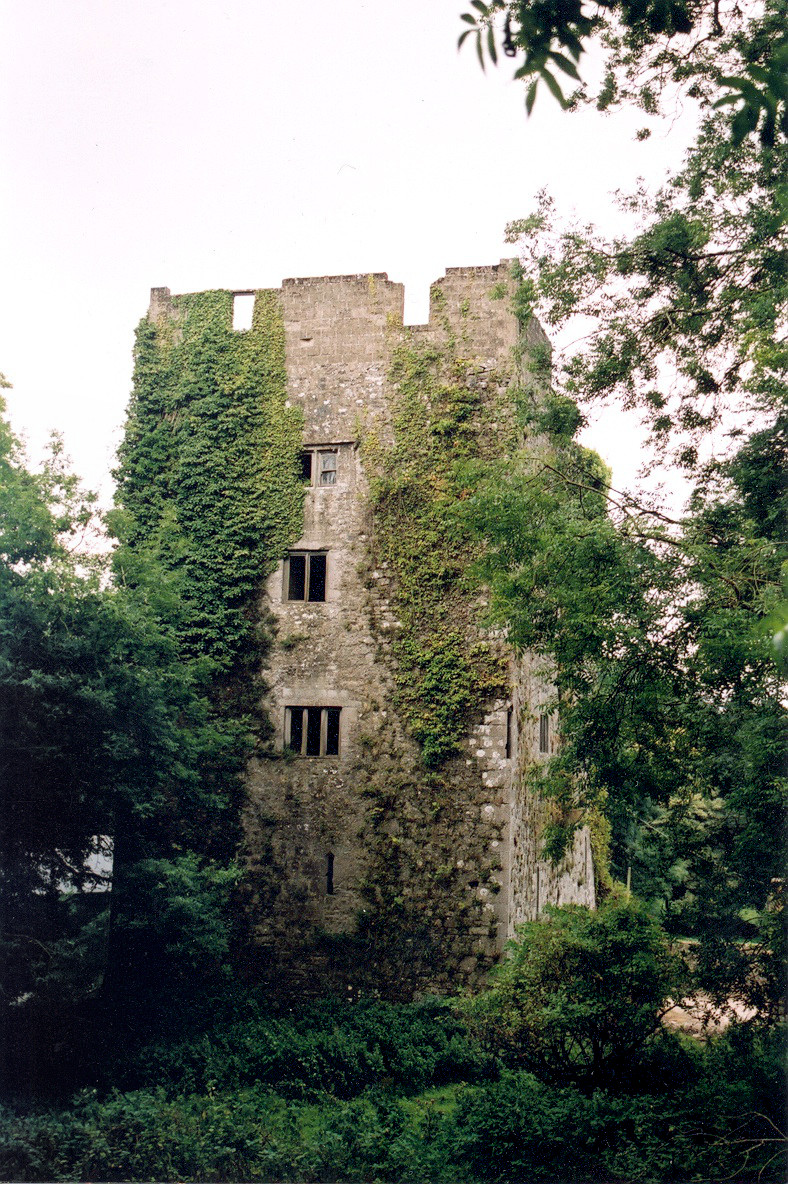
Bourchier Tower at Lough Gur (September 2005)

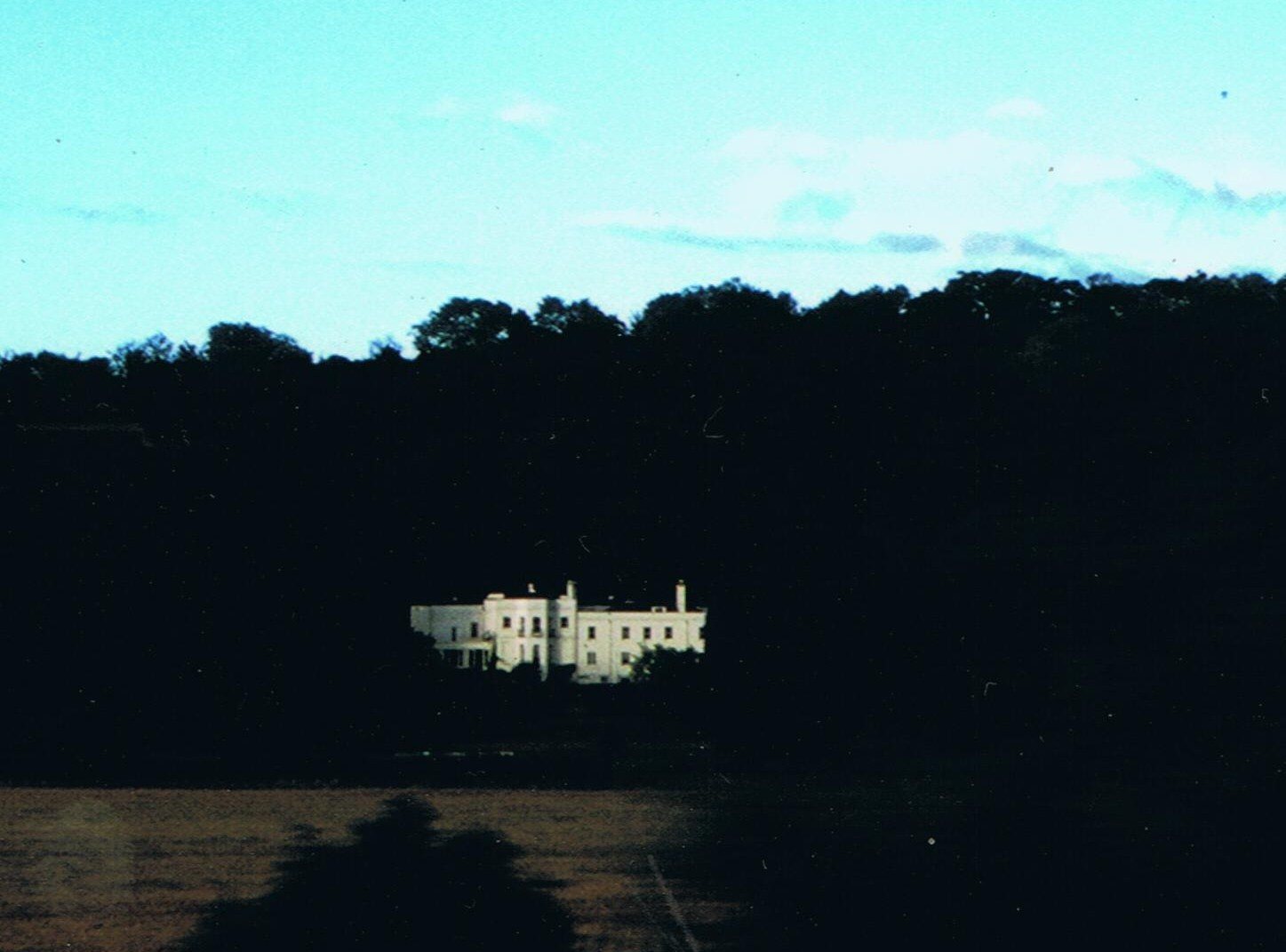
Lady Fane's, New House (The Grotto), August 2007, taken from the north, from a moving train, early morning.

== Notes ==
Parliament of Ireland
| Preceded by Thomas Pearson; Henry Maxwell | Member of Parliament for Killybegs; 1715–1719; With: Thomas Pearson | Succeeded by Thomas Pearson; Robert Colvill |
Peerage of Ireland
| New creation | Viscount Fane; 1718–1744 | Succeeded by Charles Fane |
| New creation | Baron of Loughguyre; 1718–1744 | Succeeded by Charles Fane |
