= Jethro Tull =

Jethro Tull may refer to:

- Jethro Tull (agriculturist) (1674–1741), English agriculturist, often credited with inventing the seed drill
- Jethro Tull (band), a British rock group named after the agriculturist
