= John Montagu, 5th Earl of Sandwich =

British peer and Tory politician

The Right Honourable The Earl of Sandwich PC
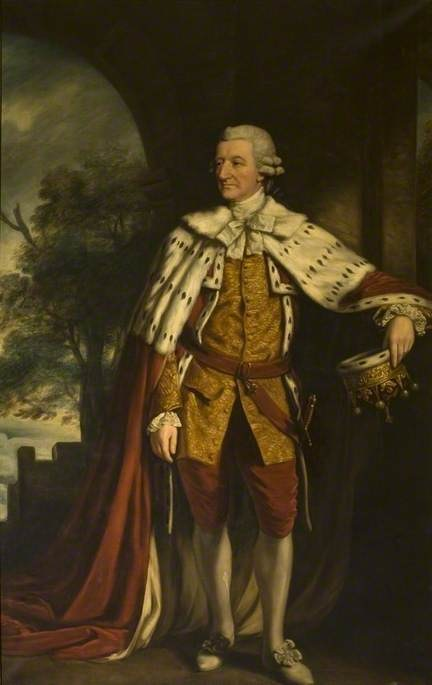

Master of the Buckhounds
- In office 1783–1806
- Monarch: George III
- Prime Minister: William Pitt the Younger; Henry Addington
- Preceded by: The Earl of Jersey
- Succeeded by: The Earl of Albemarle

Personal details
- Born: 26 January 1744
- Died: 6 June 1814 (aged 70)
- Party: Tory
- Spouse(s): (1) Lady Elizabeth Montague-Dunk (d. 1768) (2) Lady Mary Powlett
- Children: 8 (two illegitimate)
- Parent(s): John Montagu, 4th Earl of Sandwich; Dorothy Fane

John Montagu, 5th Earl of Sandwich, PC (26 January 1744 – 6 June 1814), styled Viscount Hinchingbrooke until 1792, was a British peer and Tory politician.

== Background and education ==
Montagu was the eldest son of John Montagu, 4th Earl of Sandwich, by the Honourable Dorothy Fane, third surviving daughter of Charles Fane, 1st Viscount Fane. He was educated at Eton. In 1761, at the age of 17, he joined the 3rd Regiment of Foot Guards as a captain.

== Political career ==
In 1765, Hinchingbrooke entered Parliament as Tory Member of Parliament (although he supported the Fox-North Coalition of 1783) for Brackley, a seat he held until 1768, and then represented Huntingdonshire from 1768 to 1792, when he succeeded his father in the earldom. He served as Vice-Chamberlain of the Household from 1771 to 1782, as Master of the Buckhounds from 1783 to 1806 and as Joint Postmaster General from 1807 to 1814. He was sworn of the Privy Council in 1771.

== Family ==
Lord Sandwich married firstly his distant cousin Lady Elizabeth Montague-Dunk, only daughter of the 2nd Earl of Halifax, 8 March 1766. Lady Elizabeth died in 1768 and Sandwich married Lady Mary Powlett, daughter and co-heir of Admiral Harry Powlett or Paulet, 6th and last Duke of Bolton. Lord Sandwich lived and was a rural landowner at Hinchingbrooke House today in north Cambridgeshire and held other farming interests. His eldest child, John George Montagu, by his first wife died in 1790. Lord Sandwich died in June 1814, aged 70, and was succeeded by his eldest son by his second wife, George. William is thought to be named after his uncle, William Augustus, who died at Lisbon in 1776.

Lord Sandwich had two children by his first wife, Lady Elizabeth Montague-Dunk:

- Caroline Montagu, died July 1782
- Hon. John George Montagu, born 3 April 1767, died 29 November 1790

After Lady Elizabeth's death on 1 July 1768, Lord Sandwich married Lady Mary Powlett, daughter of Harry Powlett, 6th Duke of Bolton, on 25 April 1772:

- George John Montagu, 6th Earl of Sandwich, born 4 February 1773, died 21 May 1818, married Lady Louisa Lowry-Corry, daughter of Armar Lowry-Corry, 1st Earl Belmore
- Hon. Francis Charles Montagu, died unmarried
- Lady Mary Montagu, born 27 February 1774, died 4 October 1824, married 7 October 1796 to John Henry Upton, 1st Viscount Templetown, son of the Clerk Comptroller to the Dowager Princess of Wales, Clotworthy Upton, 1st Baron Templetown
- Lady Henrietta Susannah Montagu, born 9 August 1777, died 19 November 1825, married 3 May 1798 to Lt. Col William James, son of Charles Hamilton James by his wife, Catherine Napier, daughter of Sir Gerrard Napier, 5th Bt.

Lord Sandwich also had two illegitimate children, a daughter called Harriet Montagu, who married James Grant, son of Sir Ludovic Grant of Dalvey, 6th Bt. and William Augustus Montagu who rose to the rank of Vice-Admiral in the Royal Navy.

== Ancestry ==
Ancestors of John Montagu, 5th Earl of Sandwich

Edward Montagu, 2nd Earl of Sandwich
Edward Montagu, 3rd Earl of Sandwich
Lady Anne Boyle
Edward Montagu, Viscount Hinchingbrooke
John Wilmot, 2nd Earl of Rochester
Lady Elizabeth Wilmot
Elizabeth Malet
John Montagu, 4th Earl of Sandwich
Sir Francis Popham
Alexander Popham of Littlecote
Helena Rogers
Elizabeth Popham
Ralph Montagu, 1st Duke of Montagu
Lady Anne Montagu
Lady Elizabeth Wriothesley
John Montagu, 5th Earl of Sandwich
Colonel George Fane
Sir Henry Fane
Dorothy Horsey
Charles Fane, 1st Viscount Fane
Thomas Southcott of Exeter
Elizabeth Southcote
Katherine Southcott
Hon. Dorothy Fane
Philip Stanhope, 1st Earl of Chesterfield
Hon. Alexander Stanhope
Catherine Hastings
Mary Stanhope
Arnold Burghill, of Thingehill Parva
Catherine Burghill
Grizel Prise

== Gallery ==
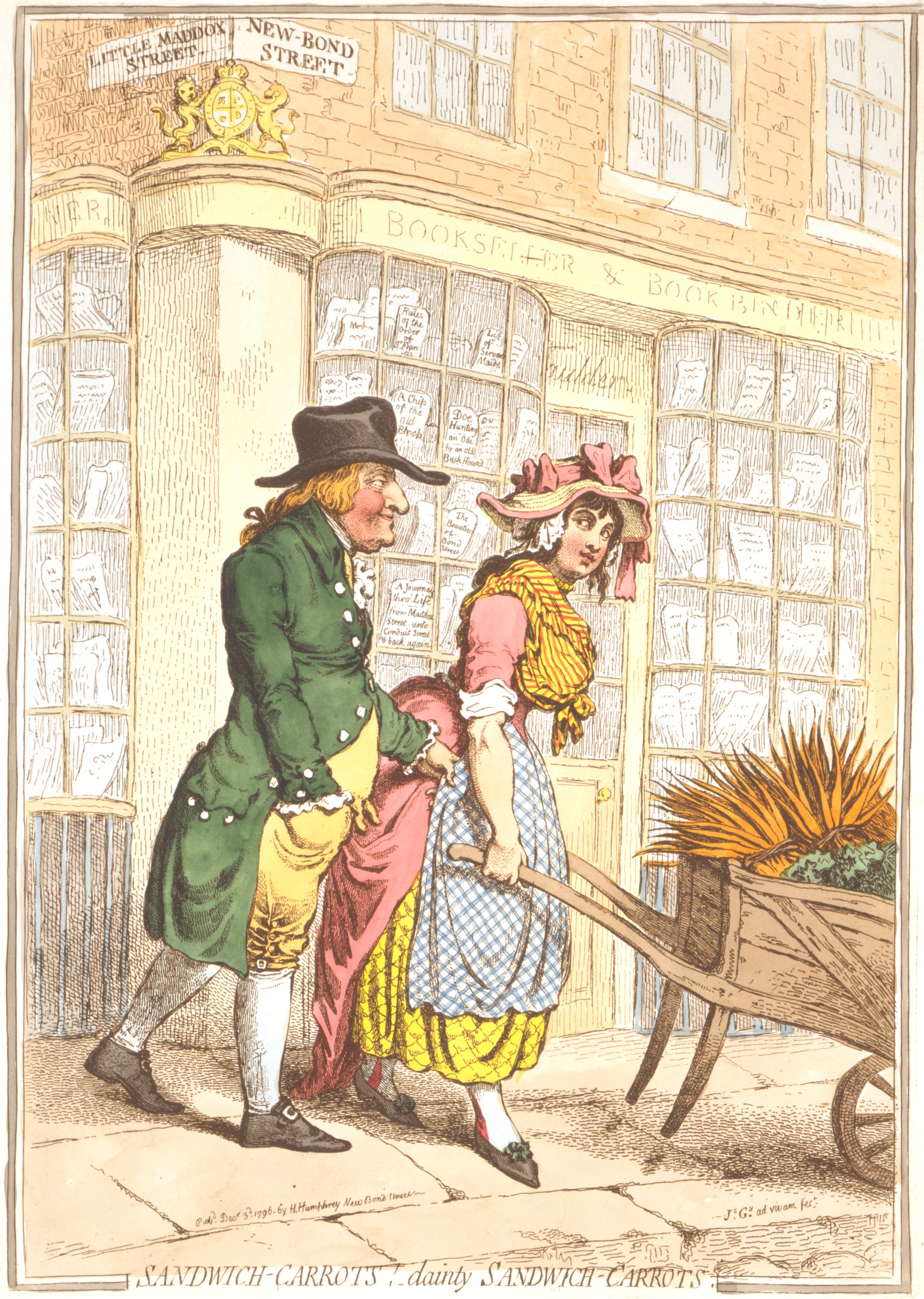
In Sandwich-Carrots!—dainty Sandwich-Carrots (1796), James Gillray caricatured Lord Sandwich slipping money into the pocket of an attractive carrot-seller, said to be one of his usual amusements.

Schedule of rental of the estates of John Montagu, 5th Earl of Sandwich and PETER DE SALIS, in the Manor of Clare in County of Armagh, 1802.

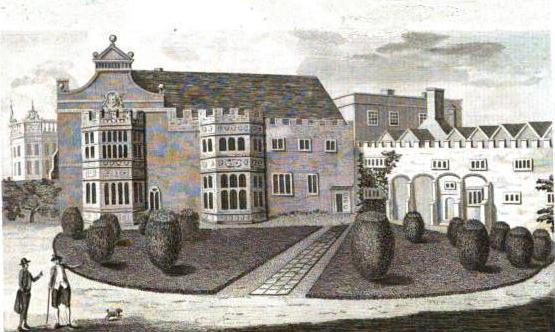
Hinchingbrook House, Huntingdon, 1787. Formerly the home of Oliver Cromwell's family.

Parliament of Great Britain
Preceded by Marshe Dickinson; Robert Wood	Member of Parliament for Brackley; 1765–1768; With: Robert Wood	Succeeded by Robert Wood; William Egerton
Preceded by The Lord Carysfort; Robert Bernard	Member of Parliament for Huntingdonshire; 1768–1792; With: The Earl Ludlow	Succeeded by The Earl Ludlow; Lancelot Brown
Political offices
Preceded by Hon. Thomas Robinson	Vice-Chamberlain of the Household; 1771–1782	Succeeded by Viscount Chewton
Preceded by The Earl of Jersey	Master of the Buckhounds; 1783–1806	Succeeded by The Earl of Albemarle
Preceded by The Earl of Carysfort; The Earl of Buckinghamshire	Joint Postmaster General (with the Earl of Chichester); 1807–1814	Succeeded by The Earl of Chichester; The Earl of Clancarty
Peerage of England
Preceded by John Montagu	Earl of Sandwich; 1792–1814	Succeeded by George Montagu
