= Charles Fane, 2nd Viscount Fane =

Landowner in Ireland and England

Charles Fane, 2nd Viscount Fane (c. 1708 – c. 24 January 1766) was a landowner in Ireland and England, a Whig Member of Parliament and the British Resident in Florence.

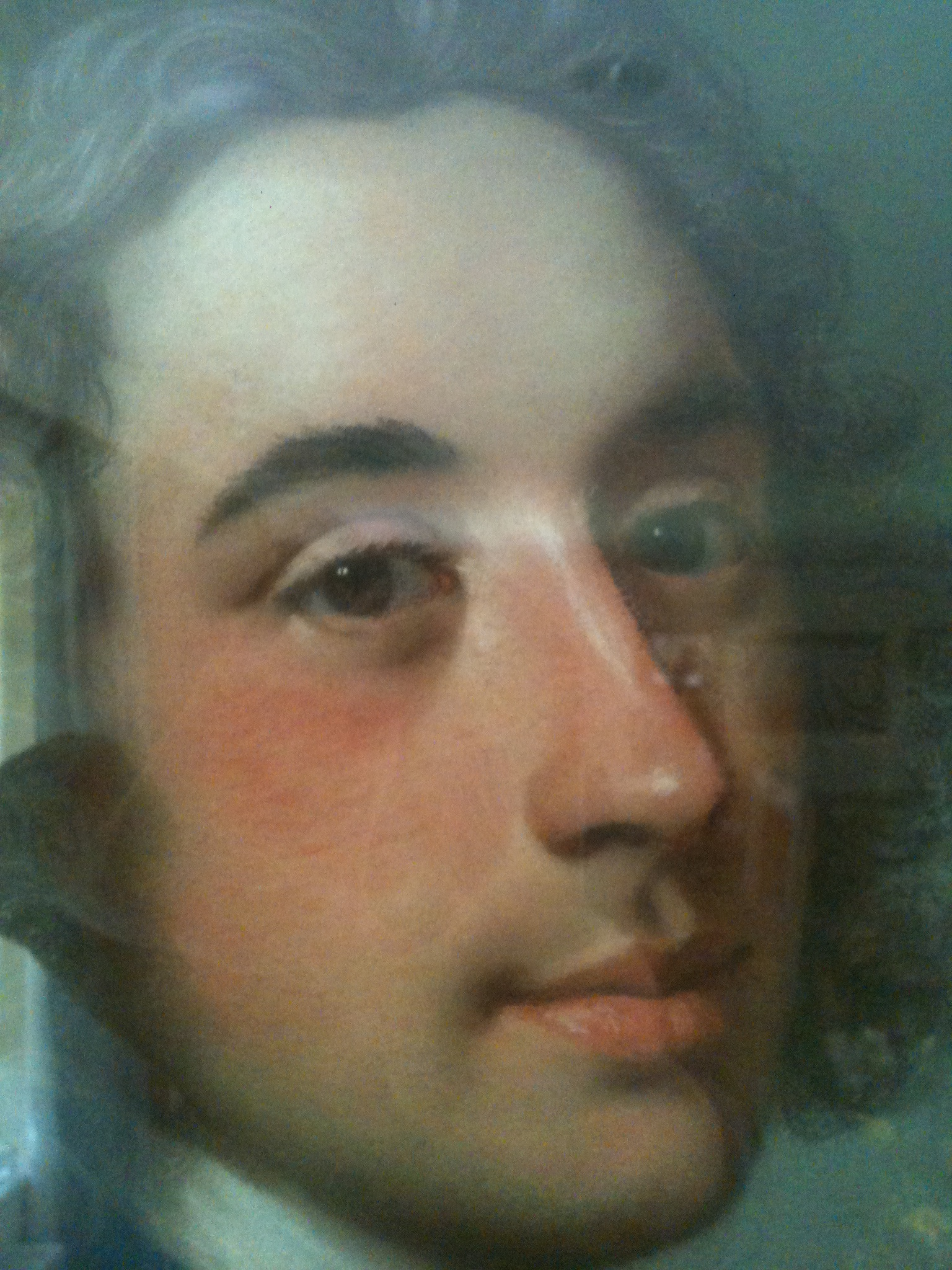
Detail of pastel of 2nd Lord Fane, mid 1730s.

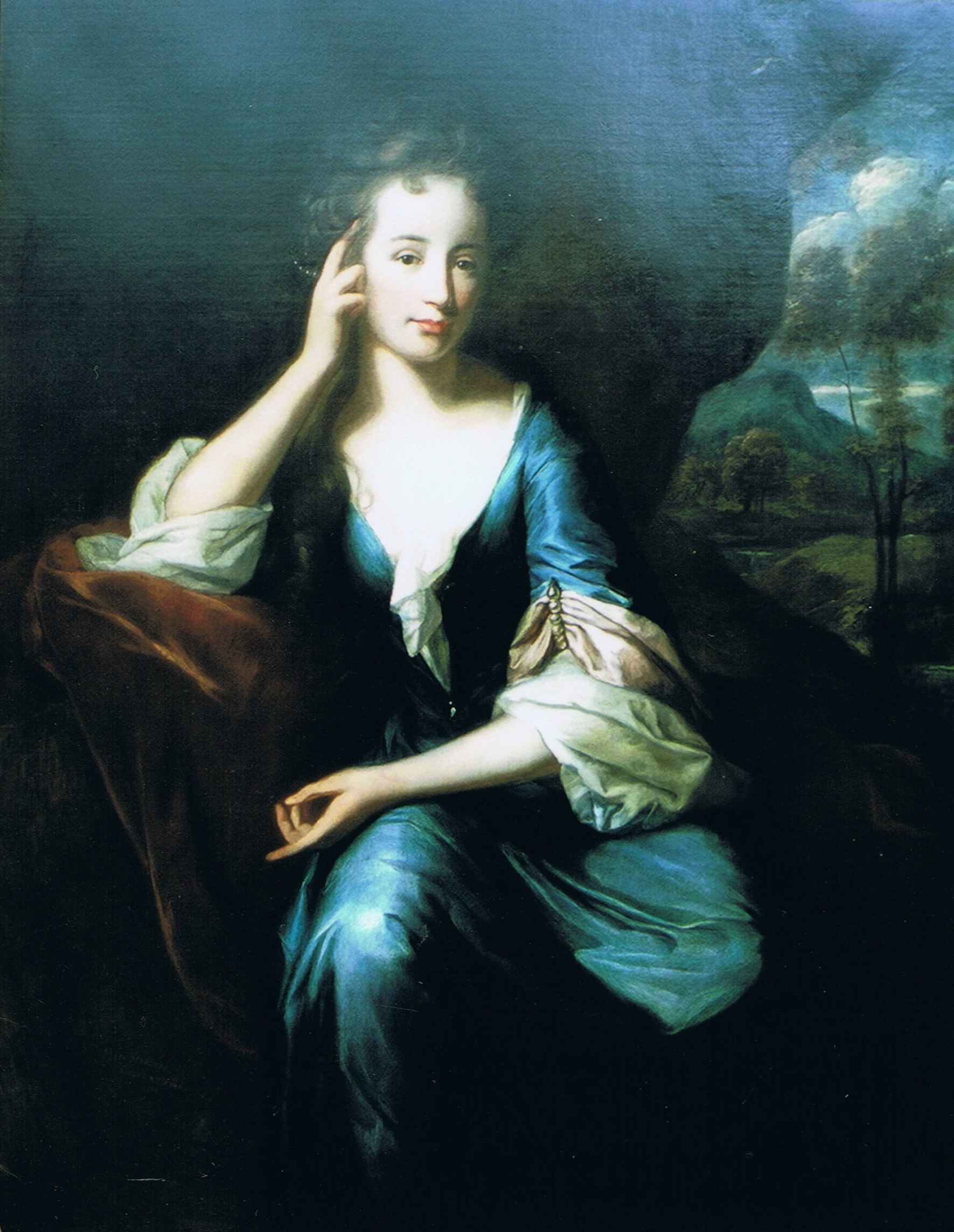
Fane's mother, Mary Stanhope in 1702, by Godfried Schalcken. The prime version of this portrait is at Chevening

== Early life ==
He was the eldest son of Charles Fane, 1st Viscount Fane by his wife Mary (1686–1762) daughter of the envoy Hon. Alexander Stanhope, FRS and sister of the soldier-statesman James Stanhope, 1st Earl Stanhope (1673–1721). Fane was educated at Eton c. 1718–1725, and Geneva which was part of his 1726–1729 Grand Tour. He is reported to have left Venice on 20 January 1730 (Ingamells and Ford).

== Political career ==
A friend and follower of John Russell, 4th Duke of Bedford (1710–1771) he was an Opposition Whig Member of Parliament (MP) for Tavistock from 1734 to 1747, and a Member for Reading in Berkshire from 1754 to 1761.

Fane interrupted his duties as member for Tavistock when he was appointed Minister Plenipotentiary (British Resident) to the Tuscan court in March 1734, with an annual salary of 1,300 pounds. He coincided with the final months of Gian Gastone de' Medici, the last Medici Grand Duke. He was in Florence in person between 3 October 1734 and spring 1738; when Horace Walpole's later friend Horace Mann, his deputy, replaced him (as the Chargé d'Affairs). Here's Mann in a letter to Walpole of 7 September 1745:

'He [Mr Blair] tells me besides that Lord Fane was appointed [he wasn't] ambassador to Constantinople, and would soon set out. This, I own, surprised me, though on reflecting, that seems a proper place for him both to indulge his natural indolence on a sofa, and at other times his passion for horses.'

He joined White's Young Club (a sub-set of the original) in its foundation year 1743. He succeeded his father in 1744 to estates in near Tandragee in county Armagh; near Lough Gur in county Limerick; at Basildon House in Berkshire; and near Tiverton in Devon. The Irish estates derived from Henry Bourchier, 5th Earl of Bath, an ancestral uncle by marriage, while the Devonshire estates had come from his maternal grandmother's family of Southcote.

At 18 April 1754 poll, after a remarkably expensive contest, Fane only beat the third placed contestant, the court Whig, John Dodd, by one vote, 296 to 295. Dodd petitioned against Fane's return. Bedford and Pitt organised Fane's defence. The painter William Hogarth depicted the 1754 election in his series the Humours of an Election, 1755, which was based on the election in Berkshire's neighbour Oxfordshire.

== Marriage ==
On 7 June 1749 Fane married at St Benet Paul's Wharf, Susanna, Lady Juxon (1706–10 April 1792). She was the youngest daughter of John Marriott, Registrar of the Court of Chancery, of Stuston Hall, near Diss in Suffolk, and of Sonning in Berkshire.

In 1726 she had married Sir William Juxon, 2nd Bt (dsp1739/40) of Little Compton in Gloucestershire (now Warwickshire), the heir and great nephew of Archbishop Juxon. As a widow she lived at Little Compton and at Fane's house in Curzon street.

== Home on Curzon Street ==
Fane's leasehold dwelling-house, still extant, on the north side of Curzon Street in London, was bought from Elizabeth Shepherd in 1753. He negotiated with the ground landlord, Nathaniel Curzon, for a wider site and added the two-bow fronted wings. The house was given up on the death of his widow in 1792. In 1984 the Saudi Arabian government bought it, by then known as Crewe House, for its embassy, paying 37 million pounds.

== Death ==
Sometimes referred to as Charles Lord Viscount Fane and before that as Hon. Charles Fane, he died without issue and was buried at Lower Basildon, Berkshire, 31 January 1766. His estates, after considering his widow, were divided between his surviving sisters, Mary, wife to Jerome de Salis, and Dorothy wife of John, fourth Earl of Sandwich.

The mansion house and estate at Basildon was sold to the Nabob, Sir Francis Sykes, 1st Baronet, and the great house was replaced by a bijoux Palladian villa, Basildon Park. His mother's renowned grotto down the hill at the Thames-side New House soon disappeared, though the house still stands. The lands in Armagh and Limerick were retained. They were finally partitioned in 1806.

Fane is in two of the monumental hunting scenes by John Wootton in the Hall at Althorp. They were commissioned by Charles Spencer, 3rd Duke of Marlborough and fifth Earl of Sunderland in 1733/34. When Lord Sunderland's youngest brother hon. Jack Spencer died in 1746, their old school friend Fane became guardian of the son, the future 1st Earl Spencer.

== Gallery ==
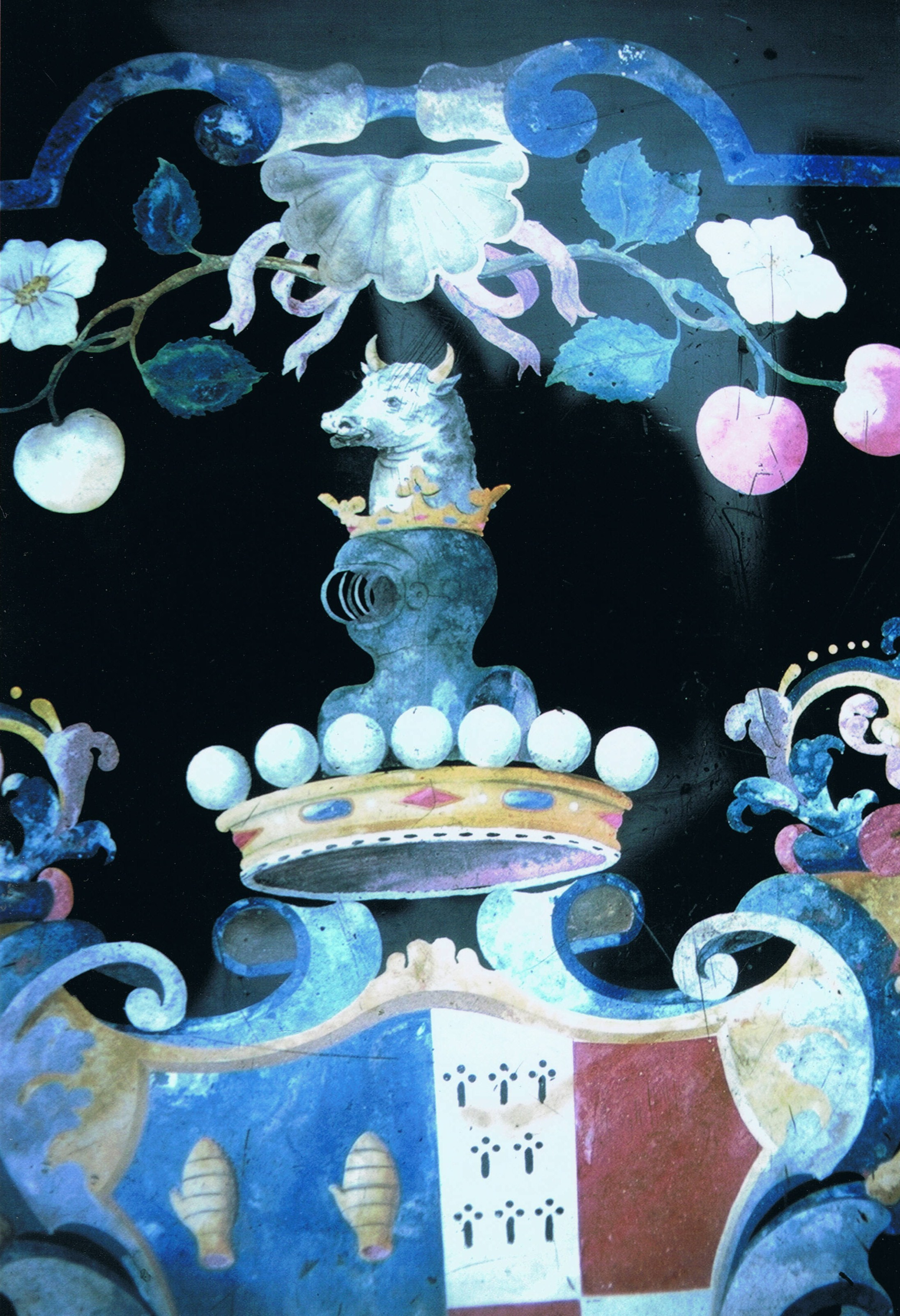
Detail of a scagliola table top, possibly by Ignazio Hugford, with the arms of Fane impaling Stanhope, for his parents, which it seems his mother had ordered while visiting him in Florence, c1736.

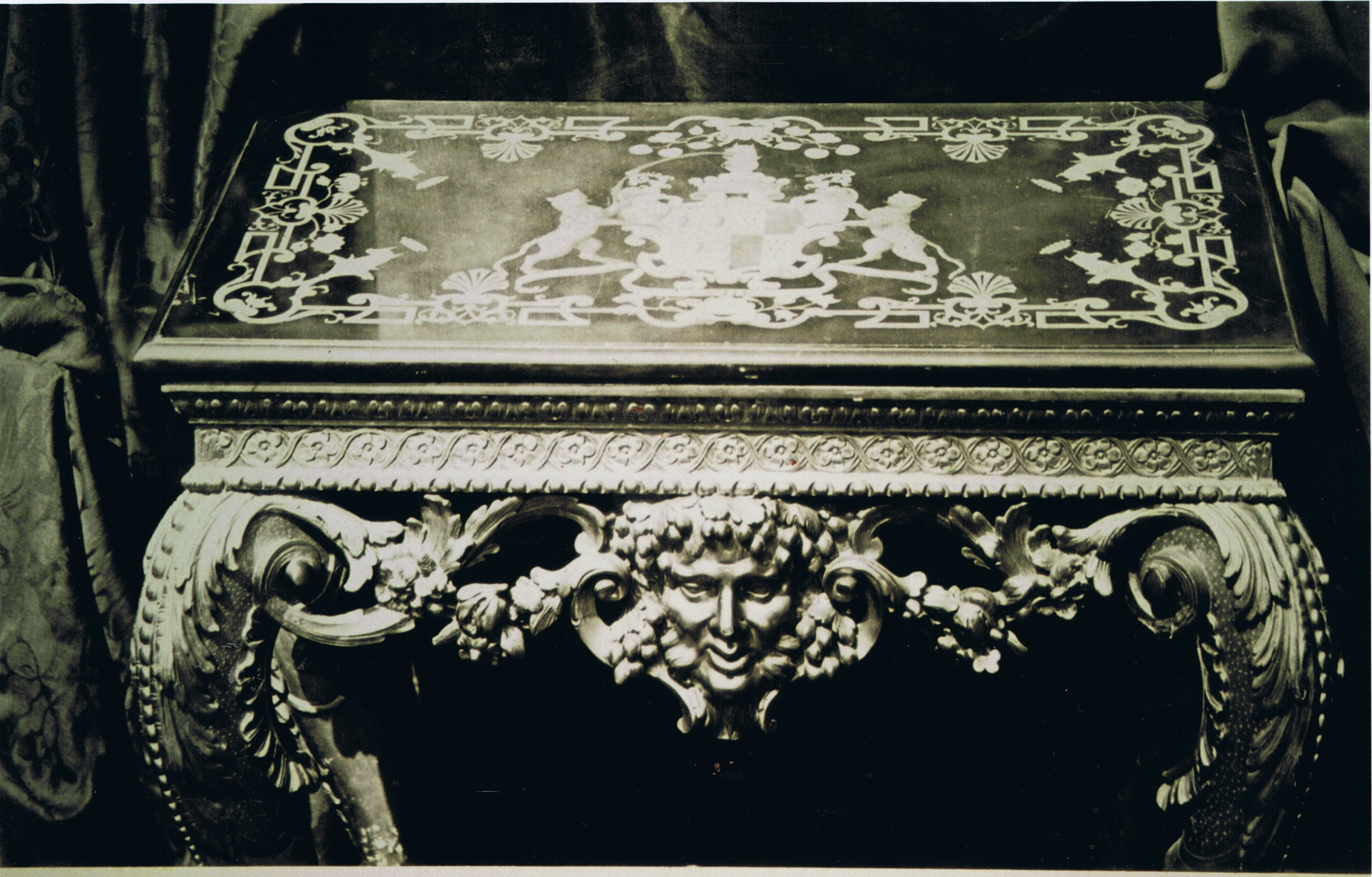
Nineteenth century photograph of the Florentine Table, with scagliola top, and possibly William Kent base, with the arms of Fane impaling Stanhope.

Parliament of Great Britain
| Preceded by Sir Francis Henry Drake, Bt; Sir Humphrey Monoux, Bt | Member of Parliament for Tavistock; 1734–1747; With: Sidney Meadows 1734–41; Lord Sherard Manners 1741–42; The Viscount of Limerick 1742–47 | Succeeded by Richard Leveson-Gower; Thomas Brand |
| Preceded by John Conyers; Richard Neville Aldworth | Member of Parliament for Reading; 1754–1761; With: William Strode 1754–55; John Dodd 1755–61 | Succeeded by Sir Francis Knollys; John Dodd |
Diplomatic posts
| Preceded by Francis Colman | British Envoy to Tuscany; 1733–1739 | Succeeded by Horace Mann |
Peerage of Ireland
| Preceded by Charles Fane | Viscount Fane; 1744–1766 | Extinct |
