= Dorothy Montagu, Countess of Sandwich =

British countess

Black & white reproduction of a pastel portrait of a lady of the Montagu family, possibly Dorothy Montagu, Countess of Sandwich, or his sister Elizabeth Courtenay, by Francis Cotes, RA, 1758.

Dorothy Montagu, Countess of Sandwich (22 March 1717 – 17 July 1797), formerly The Hon. Dorothy Fane, was a British peeress and wife of the 4th Earl of Sandwich.

== Family and marriage ==
Dorothy was born on 22 March 1717, the third surviving daughter of Charles Fane, 1st Viscount Fane (1676–1744) by his wife Mary (1686–1762) daughter of the envoy Hon. Alexander Stanhope, FRS. Mary was the sister of soldier-statesman James, 1st Earl Stanhope (1673–1721), and was one of the six original Maids of Honour to Queen Anne, appointed 4 June 1702.

Dorothy was baptised on 27 April 1717 at St. Giles in the Fields.

On 14 March 1741, shortly before her 24th birthday, she married at St James's John Montagu, 4th Earl of Sandwich.

In a letter to Horace Walpole dated 23 December 1742, the British Resident in Florence, Horace Mann, who had been her brother's charge d'affairs when he held the post, describes the birth of her first son, who died soon after: 'your friend Lady Sandwich has got a son; if one may believe the belly she wore it is a brave one.' In a letter dated 10 January 1747 Mann tells Walpole: 'I don't believe I am a favourite with my Lady, though I really deserve to be one on many accounts, and for being very essentially instrumental in getting her her Lord.'

She and her husband separated in 1754 or 1757 and she was granted an apartment in Windsor Castle with an elder sister, Elizabeth.

In June 1755 her friend and cousin by marriage, Elizabeth Montagu, wrote: "I suppose you know that Lady Sandwich has at last left her kind Lord. To complete the measure of his good usage, he keeps her daughter [Mary, then aged seven] to educate with the Courtenays. I hope her Ladyship will be happier than she has been for many years. She has taken a home at Windsor for the summer.

She also lived at the Fanes' Thames-side New House at Basildon in Berkshire.

Her brother, Charles, 2nd Viscount Fane, died without issue and his estates in Berkshire, Armagh, and Limerick were inherited by her and her surviving sister Mary, Madame de Salis, Countess de Salis, wife to Jerome, 2nd Count de Salis.

Dorothy had one surviving son, John Montagu, 5th Earl of Sandwich (1744–1814).

The other children were:

- Edward-Montagu (30 June 1745 – 2 November 1752);
- William-Augustus (February 1752 – Lisbon January 1776);
- Mary (23 February 1748 – 25 June 1761).

== See also ==
- John Montagu, 4th Earl of Sandwich
