= Lower Basildon =

Village in Berkshire, England

Coordinates: 51.50396°N 1.12397°W

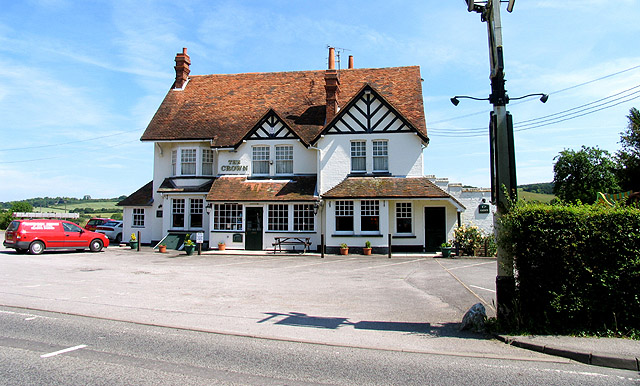
- Typical Building Style

- Location within Berkshire
- OS grid reference: SU609787
- Civil parish: Basildon
- Unitary authority: West Berkshire
- Ceremonial county: Berkshire
- Region: South East
- Country: England
- Sovereign state: United Kingdom
- Post town: READING
- Postcode district: RG8
- Dialling code: 01491
- Police: Thames Valley
- Fire: Royal Berkshire
- Ambulance: South Central
- UK Parliament: Newbury

Lower Basildon is a small English village in the civil parish of Basildon, near Pangbourne, in the county of Berkshire.

== Amenities ==
=== Shops and restaurants ===
Upper Basildon has a sub-post office (located in St Stephen's Church) and a pub-restaurant, The Red Lion. Lower Basildon currently has a garage/shop and a motor repair business.

=== Transport ===
The village is covered only by a Tuesday bus service running between Goring-on-Thames and Reading. The nearest railway station is Goring and Streatley (2.6 miles; 4.2 km) which offers stopping trains between Didcot and London Paddington. The main A329 road connects the village with Streatley and Reading.

=== Beale Wildlife Park ===
To the south-east of the village there is a wildlife garden, Beale Park.

== Historic buildings ==
=== St Bartholomew's Church ===
The 15th century parish church of St Bartholomew stands at the end of Church Lane, down by the River Thames.

=== Roman villa ===
The remains of a modest Roman villa were discovered near the church in 1839 during the construction of the Great Western Railway but nothing of the villa remains to be seen today. It housed two beautiful mosaic floors, which were unfortunately destroyed very soon after being found. A drawing of one was made by the antiquarian, Charles Roach Smith.

=== 6-12 Reading Road ===
The village is well known locally for the presence of a row of early 20th century timber-framed 'black-and-white' houses on its western side. However, only one of these possesses a true timber frame. The remainder are built of brick, and clad with timber to resemble framing. These had been specifically commissioned as workers' cottages for Basildon Park.

=== Basildon Grotto ===
Basildon Grotto, or The Grotto House, is located 0.8 miles (1.3 km) to the west of the village on the road to Streatley. The original Grotto was built in 1720 and consisted of a rock chamber filled with shells and a rock pool. This summer house was extended at the beginning of the 19th century by Arthur Smith MP to form a large mansion. Until about 2007, it was the headquarters of the Institute for Leisure and Amenity Management (ILAM). Although sold to a new owner, it remains empty, fire-damaged and ruinous.

=== Basildon Park ===
The National Trust property, Basildon Park, occupies the space between the villages of Lower and Upper Basildon.

== Notable people ==
In birth order:

- Jethro Tull (1674–1741), agriculturalist, was born in Upper Basildon and buried in the churchyard of St Bartholomew's Church in Lower Basildon, under a modern gravestone dated 1740, though he died in 1741.
- Sir Francis Sykes, 1st Baronet (1732–1804), British East India Company governor, landowner and politician, lived in Basildon, but died before his mansion was completed.
- Graham Whitehead (1922–1981), Formula 1 motor racing driver, died in Basildon.
