= Alexander Stanhope =

English envoy in Madrid

Alexander Stanhope (1638 – 20 September 1707) was an English envoy in Madrid between 1690 and 1699.

== Early life ==
He was the youngest son of Philip Stanhope, 1st Earl of Chesterfield by his second wife Anne, daughter of John 'Lusty' Pakington. He was educated at Exeter College, Oxford, graduating in 1654.

He married Catherine Burghill, daughter of Arnold Burghill of Thingehill Parva. They had several children, including:

1. James Stanhope, 1st Earl Stanhope (b 1674 – 5 February 1721) married 24 February 1713 Lucy Pitt, daughter of Thomas Pitt of Boconnoc
2. Philip Stanhope, (b. unknown; 28 September 1708) Royal Navy Captain
3. Edward Stanhope, (b. unknown; 23 December 1711) British Army Colonel
4. Mary Stanhope (b. abt. 1686 – 30 August 1762) married 12 December 1707) Charles Fane, 1st Viscount Fane

His son James Stanhope, a famous General, is sometimes considered the first Prime Minister of Great Britain between 1717 and 1721.

== Career ==
He was a Gentleman Usher to the Queen. He was an Envoy extraordinary to Spain (1689–1706) and Envoy to the States-General.

He was elected a Fellow of the Royal Society in May 1663.
