= Henry Fane (died 1706) =

Sir Henry Fane KB, JP (c. 1650 – buried Basildon 12 January 1706) was the only son and heir of George Fane (1616–1663) of Hatton Garden, by his wife Dorothy daughter and heir of James Horsey of Honnington, Warwickshire.

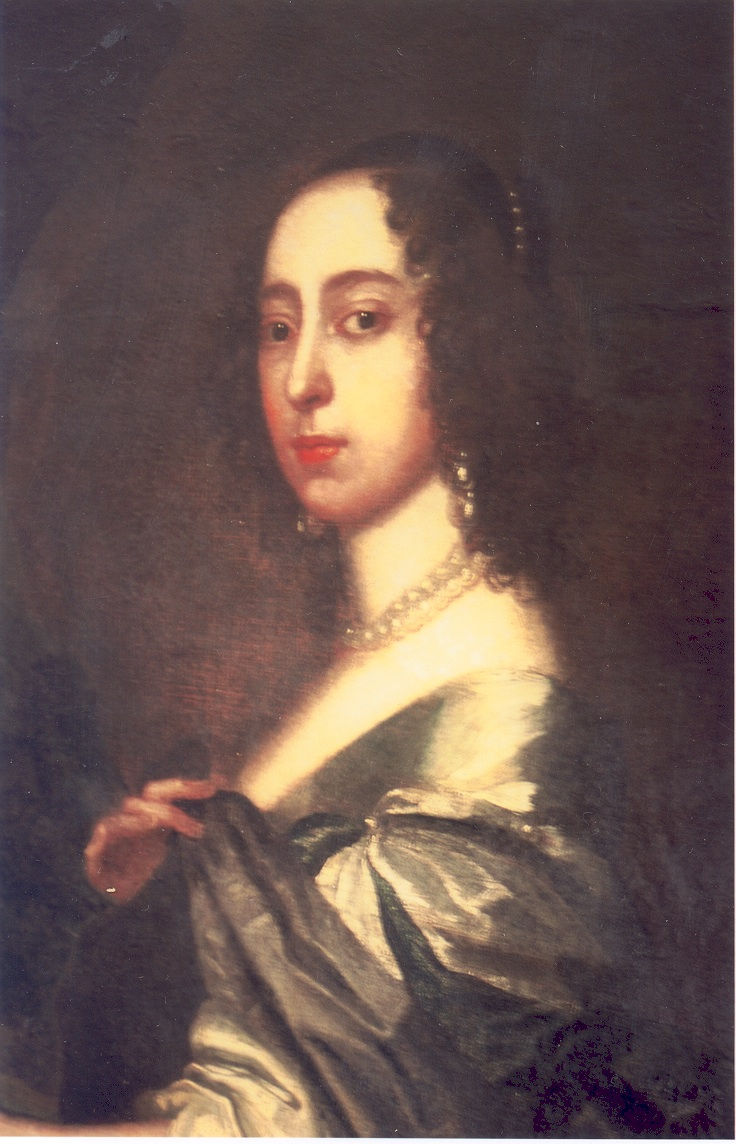
Rachael Fane, Countess Dowager of Bath. Fane's guardian, benefactrice and aunt

His aunt, Rachel, Countess Dowager of Bath, purchased for him the estate of Basildon House in Berkshire in 1656 and secured him his KB (one of the 23) at the coronation of Charles II on 23 April 1661. He was confirmed in her Irish estates on his marriage in 1668, by which time she was also his guardian. These lands, the Bourchier estate, comprised the manors of Lough Gur and Glenogra in county Limerick and of Clare in county Armagh.

Fane was returned as Whig Member of Parliament (MP) for Reading in 1689, 1690 and 1695 (1689–1698). Other awards and posts included:

- JP for Devon 1674–1687; JP for Berkshire 1675-87.
- Captain in the Queens Regiment of Horse 1678–79;
- Freeman of Wallingford 1685;
- Freedom of Belfast 1686;
- Deputy Ranger of Windsor Park from 14 May 1689.
- Commissioner for assessment Berks 1677–1680; Devon 1679–80;
- Commissioner for excise April -October 1689.
- Commissioner for Irish forfeited estates in 1690;
- Governor of county Limerick, c. 1699;
- Irish Privy Councillor from 1690 til death.

In May 1690 he was granted a valuable lease of land at the end of Duke street adjoining St. James's Park. It measured 25 by 800 ft.

He married, licence dated 28 April 1668, Elizabeth (baptised Barnstaple 9 February 1650 - buried Basildon 15 December 1724), daughter of the late Thomas Southcott of Exeter, the younger son of Richard Southcott, of Calwoodley (Calverleigh), near Tiverton, Devon. She was heir of her nephew George Southcott (Southcote) of Calwoodley. The property at Calverleigh, Bampton and Templeton was sold after 1749 and 1767 having been dis-entailed by act of Parliament. His mother Dorothy married thirdly Edward Wray of Barlings in Lincolnshire. In 1694 their daughter passed the estate of Barlings to her half-brother Sir Henry.

Fane's widow, Dame Elizabeth, having stayed at Mrs. Kitcnohams [sic] in Greek Street in 1708, lived in Frith Street in 1709, and in 1713–1723 she was at no. 19 (17) Soho Square.

His eldest son Henry Bourchier Fane was killed in a duel by Elizeus Burges, who later was British Resident in Venice. The second son, his heir, Charles was created Viscount Fane (1675/76–1744). The third son George (d. 1709) was a Captain in the Royal Navy and died a commander of HMS Lowestoffe (launched 1697) in the harbour of New York. Another son Henry (c. 1685–1712/13) was one of the nominees for the first British tontine of 1693. There was a fifth son, Thomas.
