= Jethro Tull (agriculturist) =

English agricultural pioneer (1674–1741)

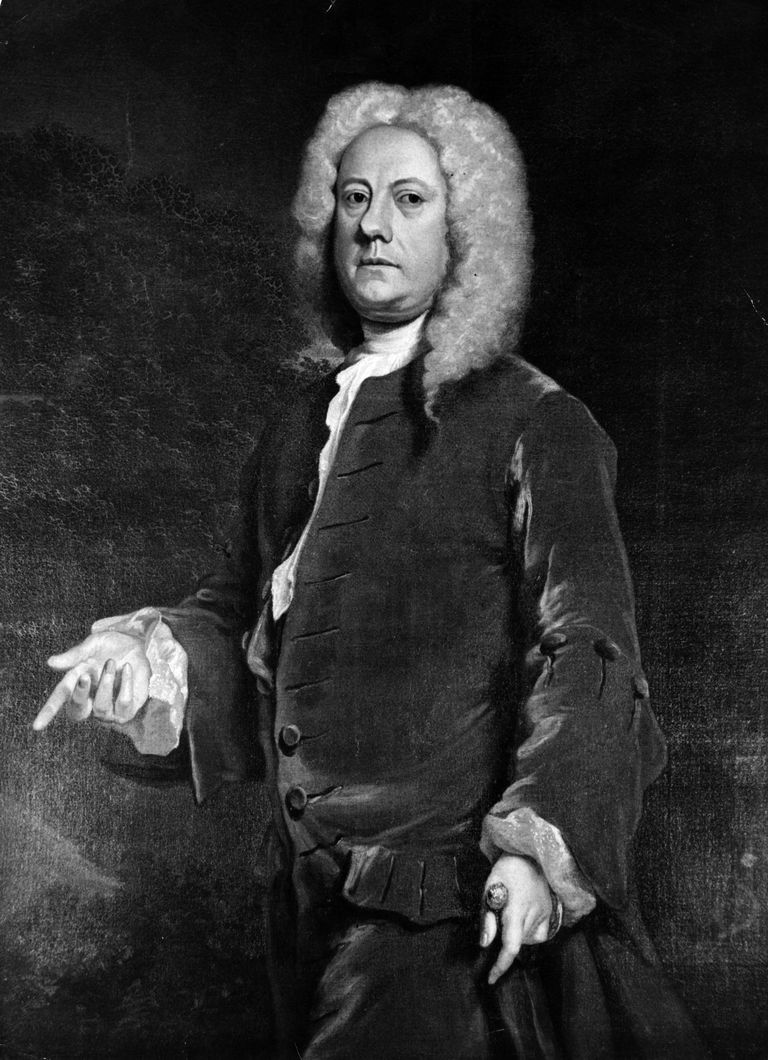
- Born: 1674; Basildon, Berkshire, England
- Died: 21 February 1741 (aged 66); Prosperous Farm, Shalbourne, Berkshire, England
- Resting place: St Bartholomew's Church, Lower Basildon, Berkshire, England
- Known for: Agricultural reforms and inventions, such as the seed drill and horse-drawn hoe
- Spouse: Susanna Smith
- Children: 3

Jethro Tull (baptised 30 March 1674 – 21 February 1741, New Style) was an English agriculturist from Berkshire, England, who helped to bring about the British Agricultural Revolution of the 18th century. He developed a horse-drawn seed drill in 1701 that economically sowed the seeds in neat rows and later developed a horse-drawn hoe. Tull's methods were adopted by many landowners and helped to provide the basis for modern agriculture.

== Biography ==
Tull was born, probably in Basildon, Berkshire, to Jethro Tull and his wife Dorothy, daughter of Thomas Buckeridge and Elizabeth, née Clarke. He was baptised at Basildon on 30 March 1674, grew up in Bradfield and matriculated at St John's College, Oxford at age 17. He trained for the legal profession, but appears not to have taken a degree. He became a member of Staple Inn and was called to the bar on 11 December 1693 by the benchers of Gray's Inn.

Tull married Susanna, daughter of John Smith, of Burton Dassett, Warwickshire. They settled on his father's farm at Howberry, near Crowmarsh Gifford, Oxfordshire, where they had one son and two daughters.

Soon after his call to the bar, Tull became ill with a pulmonary disorder and travelled to Europe in search of a cure. He spent a considerable amount of time in Montpellier in the south of France. During his tour, Tull carefully compared the agriculture of France and Italy with that of his own country, and lost no chance to observe and note everything which supported his own views and discoveries. On more than one occasion, he alluded in his work to the similarity of his own horse-hoe husbandry to the practice followed by the vine-dressers of the south of Europe in constantly hoeing or otherwise stirring their ground. Finding that they did not approve of dunging their vineyards, Tull readily adduced the fact in favour of his own favourite theory: that manuring soil is an unnecessary operation. Returning to England, in 1709 he took into his own hands the farm called Prosperous, at Shalbourne (then in Berkshire, now in Wiltshire). Here, resuming the agricultural efforts he had commenced earlier, he wrote his book Horse-hoeing Husbandry (1731).

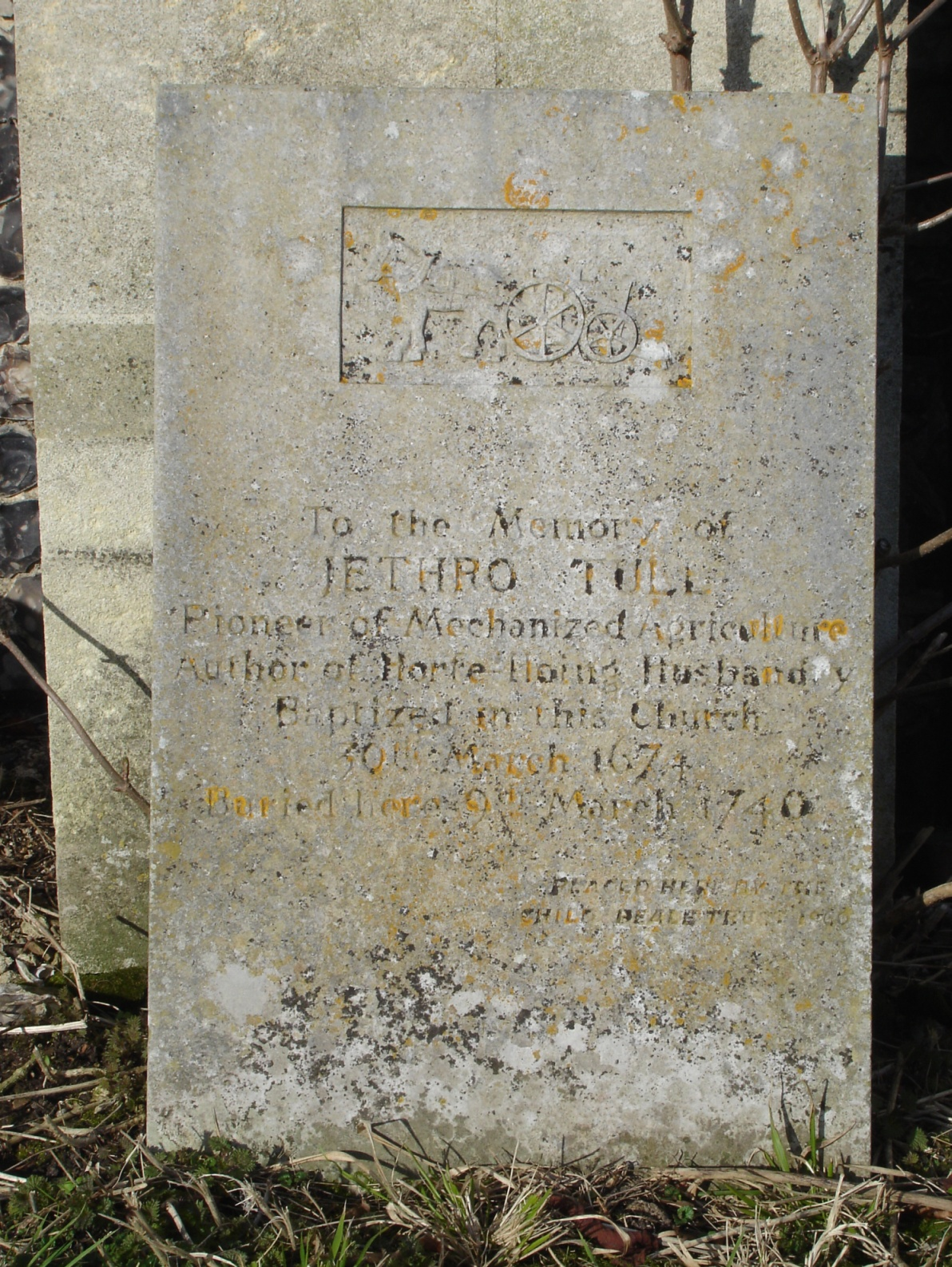
Tull's gravestone at St Bartholomew's Church, in Lower Basildon, Berkshire

Tull died on 21 February 1741 at Prosperous Farm and is buried in the graveyard of St Bartholomew's Church, Lower Basildon, Berkshire (now redundant), where he had been baptised. His modern gravestone bears the burial date 9 March 1740 using the Old Style calendar, which is equivalent to the modern date 20 March 1741.

== Work ==
In his travels, Tull found himself seeking more knowledge of agriculture. Influenced by the early Age of Enlightenment, he is considered to be one of the early proponents of a scientific – and especially empirical – approach to agriculture. He helped transform agricultural practices by inventing or improving numerous implements.

Tull made early advances in planting crops with his invention of the seed drill (1701) – a mechanical seeder that sowed efficiently at the correct depth and spacing and then covered the seed so that it could grow. Before the introduction of the seed drill, the common practice was to plant seeds by broadcasting (evenly throwing) them across the ground by hand on the prepared soil and then lightly harrowing the soil to bury the seeds to the correct depth.

At a later period (1730–1740), Tull devoted all his energies to promote the introduction of this machine, "more especially as it admitted the use of the hoe."

In his book Horse-hoeing Husbandry (published in 1731), Tull described how the motivation for developing the seed-drill arose from conflict with his servants. He had struggled to enforce his new methods upon them, in part because they resisted the threat to their position as labourers and their skill with the plough.

=== Drill husbandry ===
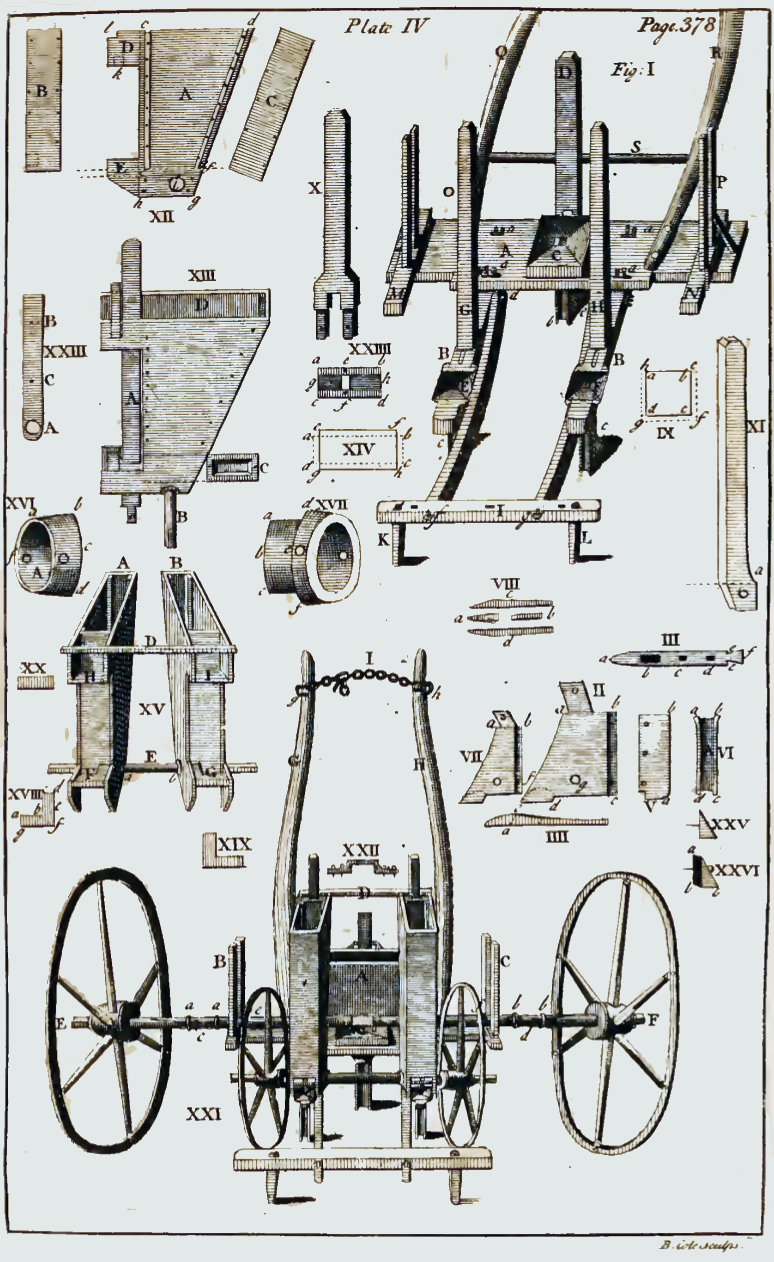
Tull's Seed drill (Horse-hoeing husbandry, 4th edition, 1762)

Tull invented some machinery for the purpose of carrying out his system of drill husbandry, about 1733. His first invention was a drill-plough to sow wheat and turnip seed in drills, three rows at a time. There were two boxes for the seed, and these, with the coulters, were placed one set behind the other, so that two sorts of seed might be sown at the same time. A harrow to cover in the seed was attached behind.

Tull also invented a turnip-drill somewhat similar to the other in general arrangement, but of lighter construction. The feeding spout was so arranged as to carry one half of the seed backwards after the earth had fallen into the channel; a harrow was pinned to the beam; and by this arrangement one half of the seed would spring up sooner than the other, allowing part to escape the turnip fly.

When desirable to turn the machine, the harrow was to be lifted and the feeding would stop. The manner of delivering the seeds to the funnels in both the above drills was by notched barrels, and Tull was the first to use cavities in the surfaces of solid cylinders for the feeding. Nothing material in the history of the drill then occurred until 1782.

=== Growing soil ===
Tull considered soil to be the sole food of plants. "Too much nitre," Tull wrote, "corrodes a plant, too much water drowns it, too much air dries the roots of it, too much heat burns it; but too much earth a plant can never have, unless it be therein wholly buried: too much earth or too fine can never possibly be given to their roots, for they never receive so much of it as to surfeit the plant." Again, he declares elsewhere, "That which nourishes and augments a plant is the true food of it. Every plant is earth, and the growth and true increase of a plant is the addition of more earth." And in his chapter on the "Pasture of Plants", Tull told his readers with great gravity that "this pasturage is the inner or internal superficies [sic] of the earth; or, which is the same thing, it is the superficies of the pores, cavities, or interstices of the divided parts of the earth, which are of two sorts, natural and artificial. The mouths or lacteals of roots take their pabulum, being fine particles of earth, from the superficies of the pores or cavities, wherein their roots are included."

=== Hoeing by hand ===
Tull was the first who inculcated the advantages of hoeing cultivated soils.

== Legacy ==
Tull's work on agriculture initiated a new movement in 18th-century agriculture called "horse-hoeing husbandry" or "new husbandry". His system was supported by Henri-Louis Duhamel du Monceau in France, Michel Lullin de Chateauvieux in Switzerland, John Mills in England, and many others. It offered two major innovations:

- Scarifiers and horse hoes: These implements were unknown until the 18th century. "Hoeing by manual labour had, in very early ages, been partially practised; for the earliest writers [...] recommended particular attention to the cutting down and destroying of weeds. But to Jethro Tull, is indisputably due the honour of having first demonstrated the importance of frequent hoeing, not merely to extirpate weeds, but for the purpose of pulverizing the soil, by which process the gases and moisture of the atmosphere are enabled more freely to penetrate to the roots of the crop."
- The use of drills: In Roman agriculture the endeavour was "to attain the advantages incident to row-culture by ploughing in their seeds. A rude machine [has] been used immemorially in India for sowing in rows. The first drill for this purpose introduced into Europe seems to have been the invention of a German, who made it known to the Spanish court in 1647." "It was first brought much into notice in this country by Tull, in 1731; but the practice did not come into any thing like general adoption till the commencement of the [19th] century." By then there were "several improved machines adapted to the sowing of corn, beans, and turnips."

The influence of the atmosphere on the soil and the increased fertility produced by pulverising and stirring heavy lands led to the notion adopted by Tull that labour might entirely supersede the necessity of manure: hence the origin of the horse-hoeing husbandry, which at one time was so highly thought of as to be called, by way of distinction, the new husbandry.

Fallows and manuring were both discarded as unnecessary; the seed was sown in rows with wide intervals, which were continually kept worked and stirred. At first the result was highly satisfactory; all the humus, by exposure to the air, was converted into soluble extract and taken up by the plants, which thrived well as long as the supply lasted: but in the end the soil was exhausted; and the warmest admirers and supporters of Tull's system, Du Hamel and De Chateauvieux, besides many others, found in practice that pulverising alone will not restore fertility. However, the system of drilling and horse-hoeing, when united with judicious manuring, has been found a great improvement in agriculture.

Tull's book upon husbandry also influenced cotton culture in the American Southern Colonies. Tull's system taught that to ensure a sufficient number of plants, they did not just need to increase the quantity of seed, but to plant the seed at regular distances.

=== Tull's farm ===
After Tull's death, his holdings of about 70 acres (28 ha) of freehold land in Berkshire found their way into Chancery, and were sold by order in 1784 to a Mr. Blandy. Tull held about 130 acres (53 ha) of additional land by a different tenure. The old brew-house he dwelt in has been modernised, but remains largely intact – as late as 1840 it was said to be in very good condition. Of the outhouses, Tull's granary and his stables remain, although deteriorating. At the end of the granary, which Tull built, is an old well. When it was cleared out some years ago, there was found under the accumulated mud of nearly a century a three-pronged hoe, which is likely to have belonged to Tull and is now in the museum of the Royal Agricultural Society of England. It may have been thrown by his men, who adopted new types of tool with reluctance and reportedly thwarted him in many ways.

Tull's Prosperous Farm in the rural parish of Shalbourne, under the Coomb Hills about 4 miles (6 km) south of Hungerford, long remained an object of interest to lovers of agriculture. Arthur Young made a pilgrimage there and William Cobbett did the same. The farmhouse was rebuilt in the 19th century.

=== Jethro Tull (Band) ===
Tull's name was used as the inspiration for the name of the 1970's progressive rock band by the same name.

== Rejection of Virgilian husbandry: debate with Stephen Switzer ==
While supported by a number of powerful patrons, Tull's revolutionary claims regarding horse-hoeing husbandry and rejection of Virgilian, "old" husbandry presented in The Horse-Hoeing Husbandry drew fire from a variety of critics. One of his most vehement dissenters was Stephen Switzer, a contemporary landscape gardener and leader of the Private Society of Husbandmen and Planters. Following the publication of The Horse-Hoeing Husbandry: Or, An Essay on the Principles of Tillage and Vegetation in 1731, Switzer fiercely attacked Tull in the final two volumes of his own monthly publication, The Practical Husbandman and Planter, in 1734. He not only accused Tull of plagiarizing his technological inventions from others, namely the horse hoe and drill, but also attacked him for his criticism of farming techniques found in Virgil's Georgics and his rejection of traditional, "Virgilian" husbandry.

Throughout the 18th century, Georgics, a didactic poem written by the Roman poet Virgil in 37–30 BC, continued to hold great philosophical and cultural power in Britain, serving not merely as poetry but as manuals of husbandry and even scientific treatises. The sheer number of English translations and editions of Georgics between 1690 and 1820 highlights its cultural significance in British society. In the preface to his translation, William Benson declares his certainty that "the Husbandry of England in General is Virgilian." In a polemic chapter entitled "Remarks on the Bad Husbandry, that is so finely Express'd in Virgil's First Georgic," Tull derides it for several apparent deficiencies in farming techniques:

- Shallow and late ploughing of poor land: Tull disagrees vehemently, as hoeing to enrich the soil is at the crux of his "New Husbandry", and encourages frequent and early ploughing. Lacking modern scientific understanding of soil nutrition, he incorrectly imagined that the act of dividing soil into smaller and smaller particles through pulverization was what gave nutrition to vegetable roots. Thus he promoted the enrichment of soil by frequent ploughing, which he reasoned would also encourage absorption of dew moisture in the land.
- Burning of stubble to enrich land: Tull derides Virgil's "unbecoming" foolishness for suggesting such a faulty method. Tull cites measurements of soil weight before and after stubble burning, noting that the decrease in soil weight must indicate loss of soil content and nutrition.
- Tilling of land with harrows and cross-ploughing: again Tull scoffs at a method of ploughing which diverged from his own.

He concludes with a declaration that his "New Husbandry," at odds with many of his contemporaries and differing "in all respects, warrants [him] calling it Anti-Virgilian."

Tull's attack was not without consequences. Switzer leapt to Virgil's defence against what he saw as groundless and polemic attacks from Tull. He took offence at Tull's rejection not only of Virgil, but of any and all who practised husbandry in his style. Switzer criticized Tull for prescribing heavy ploughing to all regardless of soil type and condition, and for his dogmatic dismissal of the value of dung. He compared Tull to a quack who claims one medicine can cure all manners of diseases. For two more volumes, Switzer fine-combs through The Horse-Hoeing Husbandry, mining Virgil for authoritative statements on agriculture and pouncing on apparently erroneous claims. Tull's rejection of a traditional mode of agronomy in favour of self-experimentation, and Switzer's defence of classical authority marked the beginnings of an intellectual discussion around the field of agricultural science.

== Selected publications ==
The works of Tull appeared between the years 1731 and 1739. A selection:

- The new horse-houghing husbandry, or, An essay on the principles of tillage and vegetation wherein is shewn, a method of introducing a sort of vineyard-culture into the corn-fields, to increase their product, and diminish the common expence, by the use of instruments lately invented by Jethro Tull. 1731; Horse-hoeing husbandry 4th ed., (1762) from John Adams's library, Internet Archive
- A supplement to the essay on horse-hoing husbandry. Containing explanations and additions both in theory and practice. Wherein all the objections against that husbandry, which are come to the author's knowledge are consider'd and answer'd. By Jethro Tull, Esq., 1736

=== Works on Jethro Tull ===
- Donaldson, John (1854). Agricultural biography: containing a notice of the life and writings of the British authors on agriculture. pp. 48–50.
- The relevant page in Robert Chambers: Chambers's Book of Days. A Miscellany of Popular Antiquities in connection with the Calendar. Philadelphia: J. B. Lippincott & Co., 1879. Digitised at the Libraries of the University of Wisconsin–Madison
- Aaron Brachfeld, Mary Choate (2010) Jethro Tull's Horse Hoeing Husbandry 5th edition
- N. Hidden (1989) "Jethro Tull I, II, III", Agric. Hist. Rev., 37 (1), pp. 26–35
- Will MacDonald et al. Makers of Modern Agriculture. Chapter 1. "Jethro Tull: Founder of the principles of dry-farming." 1913. pp. 1–15
- G. E. Fussell (1973) Jethro Tull: His Influence on Mechanized Agriculture, Osprey (The Great Innovators Series)

== Literary legacy ==
Tull was referred to in Tobias Smollett's 1771 novel, The Expedition of Humphry Clinker.
