= Upper Basildon =

Village in Berkshire, United Kingdom

Coordinates: 51.481°N 1.140°W

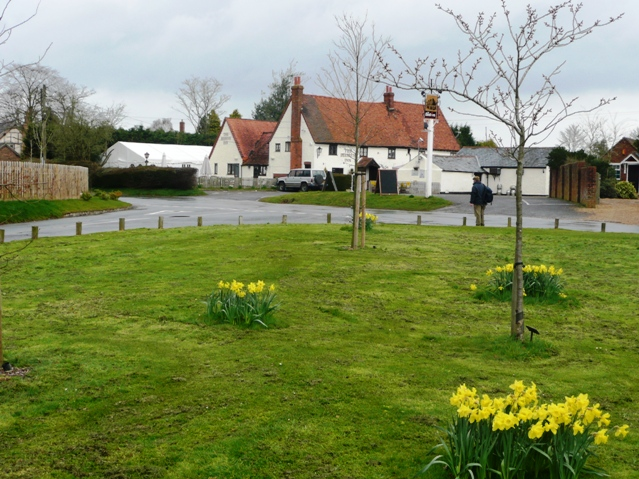
The Green

Upper Basildon is a small village in the civil parish of Basildon (where the United Kingdom 2011 Census population is included), near to Pangbourne, in the English county of Berkshire. It has a church, dedicated to St. Stephen, built in 1964 in the shape of the Christian secret symbol of a fish. Basildon Church of England Primary School is located in School Lane.

== History ==
Nobes' Tomb (or mausoleum) is located near Tomb Farm in Upper Basildon. It is now a ruin, but was regarded at one stage as being cursed, with any man who destroyed Nobes' grave being cursed. In the early 20th century, the expression "There goes Nobes on his white horse!" was commonly used. A second ghost is Nan Carey, who haunts Nan Carey's Hill, a cross roads at Upper Basildon.

In old times, Basildon Revel was held from the 20th–25th July on Upper Basildon Green.
