= St Bartholomew's Church, Lower Basildon =

Redundant church in Berkshire, England

Coordinates: 51°30.5′N 1°07.1′W

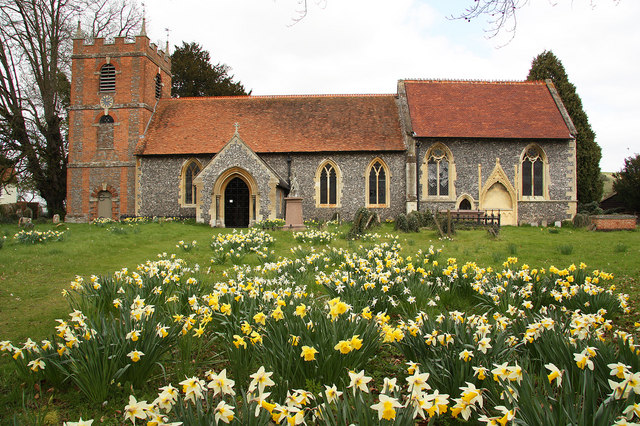
St Bartholomew's church, 2010

St Bartholomew's Church is the redundant Church of England parish church of Lower Basildon in the county of Berkshire, England. Built in the late 13th century, the structure was substantially renovated in 1875–1876. The building layout consists of nave, chancel, south porth and north aisle. The church holds a 15th-century octagonal stone font with quatrefoil side panels. Jethro Tull (1674-1740), the 18th-century agricultural inventor, was baptized in the church and buried in the graveyard. The church is designated by Historic England as a Grade I listed building.

== Description and history ==
St Andrew's Church is a redundant Church of England parish church. It is located in the hamlet of Lower Basildon, Berkshire, England and is now owned by the Churches Conservation Trust. The church was built in the late 13th century out of flint with Bath stone dressings. The building layout consists of nave, chancel, south porth and north aisle. There is a 15th-century octagonal stone font with quatrefoil side panels. The west tower was built in 1734 of grey brick with red dressings and has three stages. In the 19th century, a three bay north aisle arcade with round piers was added with chamfered arches. The louvred bell stage houses four bells. Below that on the south side is a clock. There is a 19th-century gabled porch and north aisle built in 1875–1876, and the chancel roof was rebuilt in 1876.

In the chancel wall is a 14th-century chest tomb, reused as a monument to Sir Francis Sykes, who died in 1804 and to his son. Monuments in the church include a brass plaque dedicated to John Clerk and wife, 1497; a memorial tablet to Sir Francis Sykes, 1804; and a tablet to Sir Francis W. Sykes, 1843. The church is designated by Historic England as a Grade I listed building.

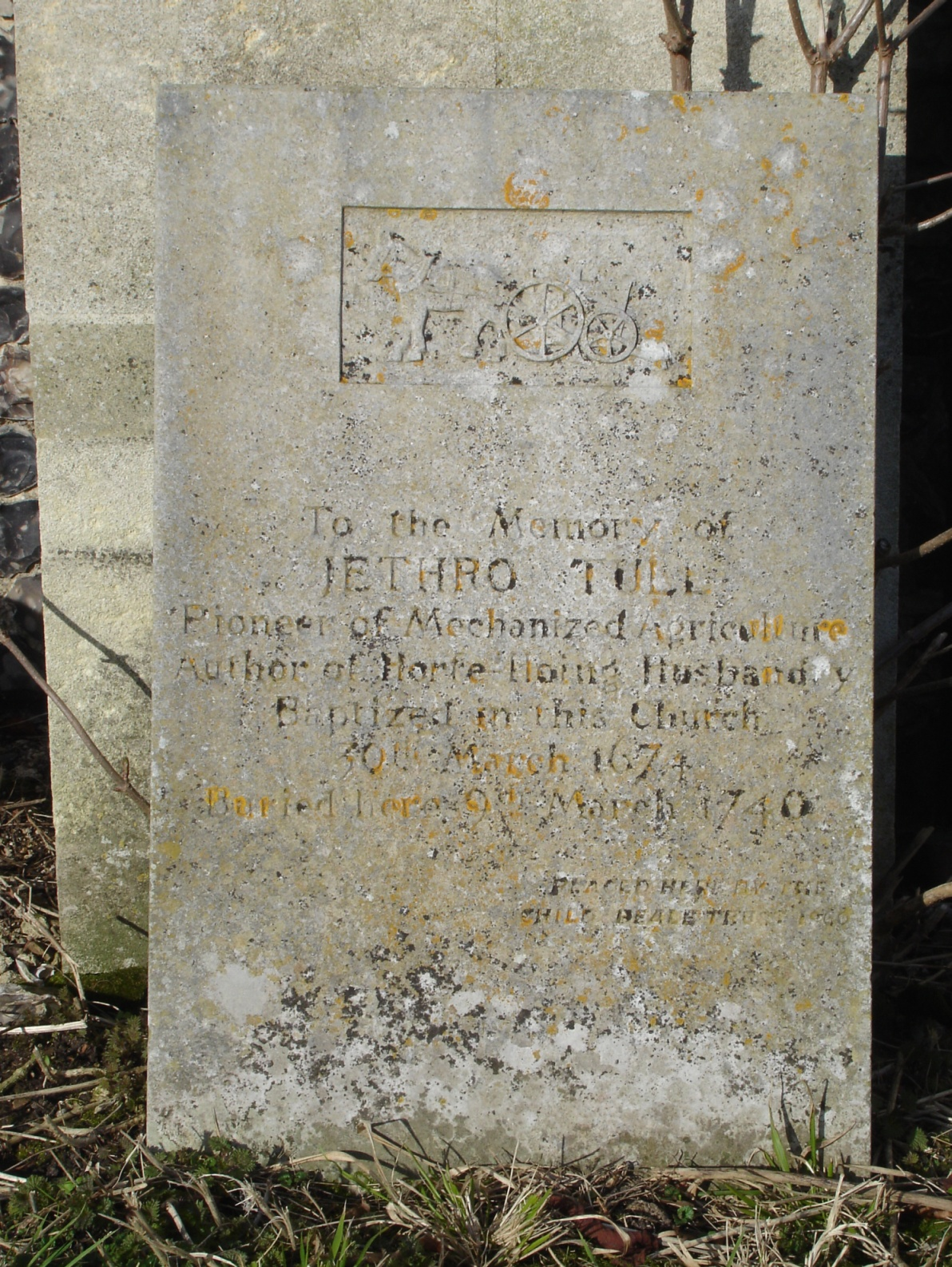
Jethro Tull's gravestone

== Jethro Tull ==
Jethro Tull, the 18th-century English farmer who played an important role in the British Agricultural Revolution, was baptized in the church and buried in the graveyard. He is best known for inventing the horse-drawn seed drill in 1701, which sowed the seeds in neat rows. Tull was baptized in St Bartholomew's church on March 30, 1674. He died in 1741 but according to his gravestone, he was buried on 9 March 1740. This apparent confusion is due to the burial date being in the Old Style.

== See also ==
- List of churches preserved by the Churches Conservation Trust in South East England
