= Iliffe =

Iliffe may mean:

== Peerage ==
- Baron Iliffe, a title in the Peerage of the United Kingdom
  - Edward Iliffe, 1st Baron Iliffe
  - Charlotte Iliffe, Baroness Iliffe
  - Langton Iliffe, 2nd Baron Iliffe

== Other people ==
- Jim Iliffe (23 April 1922 – 25 June 2005), an Australian radio and television personality
- John Iliffe (disambiguation), several people
- Marc Iliffe (27 June 1972 – 11 February 2003) was a British strongman famous for being the winner of Britain's Strongest Man contest in 2002
- Valentina Iliffe (born 17 February 1956 in Sydney, Australia), a British former alpine skier who competed in the Winter Olympics

== Companies ==
- Yattendon Group, owned by the Iliffe family

== Other ==
- Iliffe vector, In computer programming, a data structure used to implement multi-dimensional arrays
