= Graham Brown =

Graham Brown may refer to:

- Graham Brown (actor) (1924–2011), American actor
- Graham Brown (Australian cricketer) (born 1944)
- Graham Brown (English cricketer) (born 1966)
- Graham Brown (footballer, born 1944), English footballer
- Graham Brown (footballer, born 1950), English footballer
- Graham Brown (writer), American author of thrillers, particularly as co-author with Clive Cussler
- W. Graham Browne (1870–1937), Irish actor
- T. Graham Brown (Anthony Graham Brown), American country music singer

== See also ==
- Graeme Brown (disambiguation), various people
