= Charlotte Iliffe, Baroness Iliffe =

British aristocrat and suffragist (1881–1972)

The Right Honourable The Baroness Iliffe

Personal details
- Born: Charlotte Gilding; 1881 Liverpool, Lancashire, England
- Died: 18 January 1972 (aged 90–91) Yattendon Court, Berkshire, England
- Spouse: Edward Mauger Iliffe, 1st Baron Iliffe
- Children: 3 (including The 2nd Baron Iliffe)
- Parent: Henry Gilding
- Occupation: philanthropist and suffragist

Charlotte Iliffe, Baroness Iliffe (née Gilding; 1881–18 January 1972) was a British aristocrat, philanthropist and suffragist. She was a member of the Coventry Women's Suffrage Society. She was a patron of the Coventry and Warwickshire Hospital and the National Society for the Prevention of Cruelty to Children.

== Family ==
Lady Iliffe was born in 1881 in Liverpool, Lancashire. Her father was Henry Gilding, a Liverpool draper's buyer and Justice of the Peace.

On 10 June 1902 she married Edward Mauger Iliffe, who was created 1st Baron Iliffe of Yattenden by George V on 22 June 1933. He was the son of William Isaac Iliffe, founder of the Coventry Evening Telegraph, and Annette Coker. They lived at Allesley Hall, near the city of Coventry.

They had three children:

- The Hon. Kathleen Iliffe (died 1988), married Major Leslie Frederick Laurence.
- Langton Iliffe, 2nd Baron Iliffe (1908–1996), married Renée Merandon du Plessis, a Mauritian of French descent, and had no issue.
- The Hon. William Henry Richard Iliffe (1911–1956), married Christine Marie Baker, and had issue.

The Iliffe's were close friends with Canadian financier and philanthropist J. W. McConnell and his wife Lil Griffith, and the two couples holidayed together.

== Politics and activism ==
Lady Iliffe joined the Coventry Women's Suffrage Society (CWSS) and regularly attended meetings with her mother-in-law. She was active in support of the Coventry and Warwickshire Hospital board, and also supported with the local branch of The National Society for the Prevention of Cruelty to Children (NSPCC).

Lady Iliffe volunteered during the First World War with the Serbian Refugee Fund.

She died on 18 January 1972, at Yattenden Court, near Newbury, Berkshire. A collection of her seashells and a portrait painting of her is held at the National Trust property Basildon Park.
