= Nuneaton News =

- The front page of the Nuneaton News
- Type: Weekly newspaper
- Format: Tabloid
- Owner: Reach plc
- Founder(s): Peter Young; Tony Parratt
- Founded: 16 March 1992
- Political alignment: Non-partisan
- Language: English
- Headquarters: Coventry; West Midlands; England
- Circulation: 1,333 (as of 2022)
- Sister newspapers: Coventry Telegraph; Hinckley Times; Nuneaton Telegraph
- Website: Coventry Telegraph

The Nuneaton News, formerly the Heartland Evening News is a paid tabloid newspaper serving Nuneaton, North Warwickshire, Hinckley and the surrounding areas. The key areas reached by the Nuneaton News are Nuneaton and Bedworth.

== Founding ==
The paper was founded and set-up in late 1991 by two entrepreneurs experienced in the field of print journalism, former printer Peter Young, and his former colleague Tony Parratt. The first copy of the paper was printed back on 16 March 1992. The Nuneaton News was launched when there was a gap in the market when the Nuneaton Evening Tribune pulled out to become a weekly newspaper.

On 8 November 2007, the newspaper became a morning publication. At one point in time, the paper was referred to as 'the smallest paper' after reaching nightly sales of less than 10,000 copies.

In January 2009, the Heartland Evening News was renamed to the Nuneaton News.

== Ownership ==
The independent nature of the newspaper ended in 2006, when it was acquired by Lord Iliffe's regional newspaper company, Staffordshire Newspapers Limited. Following the £220m takeover of Local World by Trinity Mirror in 2015, the Nuneaton News, who were a then Local World-owned title, transferred to Trinity Mirror ownership along with 14 other then-daily regional newspapers.

The merger further seen the localised print titles and their companion websites change ownership. The Nuneaton News website was closed and merged with The Coventry Telegraph's rebranded website, CoventryLive, where localised stories which serve the area of Nuneaton are also published.

In May 2016, it was announced by Trinity Mirror that the Nuneaton News would stop operating as a daily freesheet in the town and become a weekly free newspaper instead, which seen job cuts at the title. Remaining staff members were sent to work in Tamworth and for the Coventry Telegraph in Coventry. This marked the closure of the newspaper's offices which became vacated as a result.
