= Langton Iliffe, 2nd Baron Iliffe =

British businessman and peer (1908–96)

The Right Honourable The Baron Iliffe
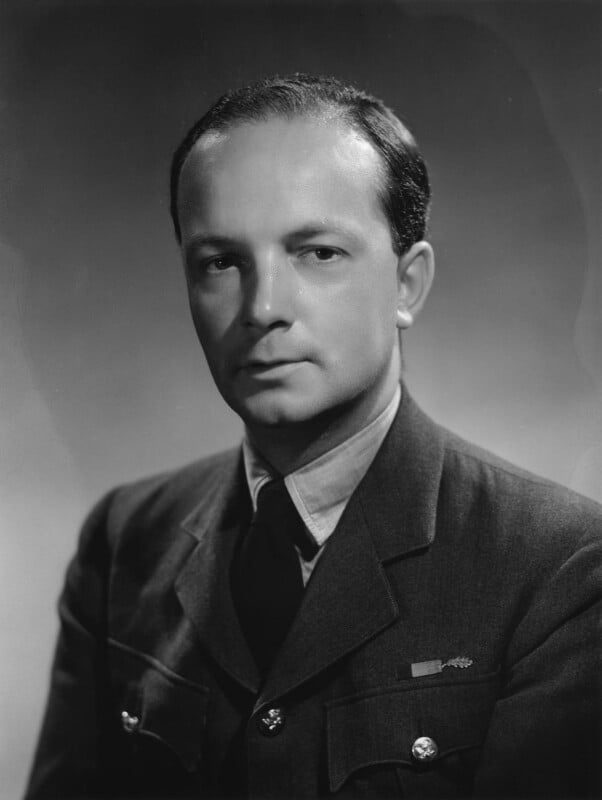
- Iliffe in 1944

Personal details
- Born: 25 January 1908 Keresley, Coventry, Warwickshire, England
- Died: 15 February 1996 (aged 88)
- Spouse: Renée Merandon du Plessis
- Parent(s): Edward Iliffe, 1st Baron Iliffe; Charlotte Gilding
- Education: Clare College, Cambridge
- Occupation: Businessman

Edward Langton Iliffe, 2nd Baron Iliffe (25 January 1908 – 15 February 1996), generally known as Langton Iliffe, was a British peer and newspaper businessman.

== Biography ==
Lord Iliffe was the son of Edward Iliffe, 1st Baron Iliffe, and Charlotte Gilding. He was born in Keresley, Coventry, Warwickshire. Iliffe studied at Clare College, Cambridge.

Iliffe married Renée Merandon du Plessis, a Mauritian of French descent, on 8 December 1938. His best man at the wedding was the architect Winton Aldridge.

Iliffe succeeded his father, as The 2nd Baron Iliffe, in 1960. As the Iliffes' marriage was childless, on Langton Iliffe's death, in 1996, the title passed to his nephew, Robert Peter Richard Iliffe, 3rd Baron Iliffe (born 1944).

During World War II, Iliffe served as a Royal Air Force intelligence officer. After the cessation of hostilities, he returned to the family business. The family owned the controlling interests in newspapers in Birmingham and Coventry, including the Birmingham Post, the Birmingham Mail and the Coventry Evening Telegraph. The Iliffes were also part owners of the British national newspaper, The Daily Telegraph. In 1957, Iliffe served as The High Sheriff of Berkshire.

In 1953, Iliffe and his wife purchased Basildon Park, a Palladian mansion near Reading, Berkshire, with views over the Thames Valley. They dedicated their lives to the restoration of the estate; over the following 25 years the couple fully restored the interior and exterior of the derelict mansion. Iliffe was deeply interested in the arts and architecture, and their restoration of Basildon Park drew inspiration from a wide circle of friends including Winton Aldridge, Ronald Tree and Graham Sutherland. On the completion of the restoration, Iliffe presented the house with a large endowment, for its future upkeep, to the National Trust.

Following the donation of Basildon Park to the National Trust, Lord and Lady Iliffe remained as tenants, eventually converting the mansion's former laundry wing into a self-contained house. Iliffe died on 15 February 1996. His wife died at Basildon in 2007 at the age of 90.

== See also ==
- Yattendon Group

== Notes ==
Peerage of the United Kingdom
| Preceded by Edward Iliffe | Baron Iliffe; 1960–1996 | Succeeded by Robert Iliffe |
