= Bedworth Echo =

- Type: Weekly newspaper
- Format: Tabloid
- Founder(s): Alan Robinson; Mort Birch
- Publisher: Coventry Newspapers
- Founded: 1979
- Political alignment: Non-partisan
- Language: English
- Ceased publication: July 2009
- Headquarters: 8 High Street; Bedworth; Warwickshire
- Country: England
- Sister newspapers: Coventry Citizen; Hinckley Herald; Hinckley Times; Nuneaton Tribune

The Bedworth Echo was a weekly paid-for newspaper founded in 1979. The Echo was the only newspaper to exclusively serve Bedworth. It was further distributed to the neighbouring market town of Nuneaton, as well as Atherstone, Coventry, Hinckley, and Market Bosworth.

The newspaper was co-founded by former Nuneaton Evening Tribune sports writer Mort Birch and former Nuneaton Observer sports editor Alan Robinson. It was owned by Midlands-based publishing group Coventry Newspapers Limited, a division of the Trinity Mirror Midlands group.

In June 2007, journalists at the Bedworth Echo, who were also members of the National Union of Journalists, voted to go on strike to protest over their pay after explaining they were unhappy with other newspaper centres owned by the group for 'earning more for doing the same job'. The Echo's journalists went on strike with Coventry Newspaper journalists from their sister titles, including The Coventry Citizen, Coventry Evening Telegraph, The Hinckley Herald & Journal, The Hinckley Times and The Nuneaton Weekly Tribune. The 24-hour walk-out strike and temporary stoppage took place on Friday 17 June 2007.

In November 2007, The Birmingham Press Club announced their shortlist for the Midlands Media Awards. John Harris, a then-reporter at the title was nominated for News Reporter of the Year and Sports Journalist of the Year at the awards that year.

Meetings were held back in September 2008 by the paper's publisher, Trinity Mirror Midlands, where executives proposed potentially making cuts and redundancies at their localised titles including the Echo. Mike O'Brien, MP for Warwickshire at the time, tried to tackle the cuts calling them 'serious attacks on news, journalists and journalism', further explaining the point that 'the Bedworth Echo has no office in the town' and that "some fine journalists try to keep in touch from a distance". Steve Brown, Trinity Mirror's regional director agreed to meet O'Brien to talk over the plans.

In July 2009, the redundancies and cutbacks which were discussed a year prior were officially announced. The news was broken coming out of a meeting held by Trinity Mirror executives. As a result, 94 jobs were set to be cut across nine regional newspapers, with jobs at the Bedworth Echo affected.
