= Winton Aldridge =

English painter

Rowland De Winton Aldridge (1906–1997) was a British architect, architectural historian and artist. He was born in Kent and named in honour of his great grandmother, Catherine Rebecca de Winton, a member of the Parry de Winton engineering family.

An authority on the architecture of the 18th century, Aldridge was an important influence on his close friend, newspaper owner the 2nd Baron Iliffe, during Iliffe's complete restoration of Basildon Park.

Aldridge was a protegee of Edward Wesson, one of the most "outstanding" watercolour artists of the 20th century. During the mid-20th century, Aldrige was a prolific artist of landscapes, seascapes and urban riverscapes. He usually signed his work "R Winton Aldridge".
