= Yattendon Group =

British media investment group

Yattendon Group plc
- Industry: New media
- Founded: About 1877
- Founder: Henry Sturmey & William Isaac Iliffe
- Headquarters: United Kingdom
- Key people: The Lord Iliffe; Chairman; Robert Peter Richard Iliffe; Chief Executive
- Website: www.yattendongroup.co.uk

Yattendon Group plc (formerly Yattendon Investment Trust) is a British-based private company owned by the Iliffe family. It has interests in Vancouver, Seattle, agriculture, marinas and local newspaper printing and publishing. It is named after the village of Yattendon in Berkshire.

== Property ==
Yattendon owns marinas via its subsidiary MDL Marinas. It also owns large areas of land in West Berkshire.

== Media ==
Yattendon previously owned Channel Television, and sold this to ITV plc in 2011.

== Iliffe Media ==
Iliffe Media publishes local newspapers and magazines and owns the KMFM chain of radio stations.

In 2016, the Iliffe family launched a new weekly newspaper and associated media under the banner of the Cambridge Independent following the absorption of its former title, the Cambridge News, into the Trinity Mirror Group after failing to return the title following the Local World venture.

Yattendon's printing press in Milton, Cambridgeshire produces full colour newspapers for a wide range of clients.

== Acquisitions ==
In January 2017, Yattendon bought 13 newspapers in Lincolnshire and East Anglia from Johnston Press. The publications are listed below:

- Bourne Local
- Bury Free Press
- Diss Express
- Fenland Citizen
- Grantham Journal
- Haverhill Echo
- Lincolnshire Free Press
- Lynn News
- Newmarket Journal
- Rutland Times
- Spalding Guardian
- Suffolk Free Press
- Stamford Mercury

== See also ==
- Edward Iliffe, 1st Baron Iliffe
- Langton Iliffe, 2nd Baron Iliffe
