= Graeme Brown (disambiguation) =

Graeme Brown is an Australian cyclist.

Graeme Brown may also refer to:

- Graeme Brown (footballer) (born 1980), South African-born Scottish footballer
- Graeme Brown (journalist), British journalist

== See also ==
- Graham Brown, various people
