= Edward Iliffe, 1st Baron Iliffe =

British politician (1877–1960)

The Right Honourable The Lord Iliffe GBE
- Sir Edward Iliffe in 1929

Member of Parliament for Tamworth
- In office 1923–1929
- Preceded by: Percy Newson
- Succeeded by: Arthur Steel-Maitland

Personal details
- Born: Edward Mauger Iliffe; 17 May 1877 Coventry, Warwickshire
- Died: 25 July 1960 (aged 83) Marylebone, London
- Party: Conservative
- Spouse: Charlotte Gilding
- Children: Langton Iliffe
- Occupation: Newspaper magnate

Edward Mauger Iliffe, 1st Baron Iliffe, (17 May 1877 – 25 July 1960) was a British newspaper magnate, public servant and Conservative Member of Parliament.

== Biography ==
Iliffe was the son of William Isaac Iliffe (1843–1917), a printer and Justice of the Peace, of Allesley near Coventry. His father, associated with Henry Sturmey, founded early publications on the motor industry and cycling. His father also founded the Coventry Evening Telegraph, which Edward began working on at age 17.

After his father died in 1917, he and his brother expanded the business and Edward ultimately became president and the principal proprietor of the Birmingham Post and the Birmingham Mail and owner of the Coventry Evening Telegraph and the Cambridge Daily News. Iliffe was also Chairman of Iliffe & Sons, a Director of London Insurance and a Member of Lloyd's as well as Deputy Chairman of Allied Newspapers Ltd. He was also part owner of The Daily Telegraph together with Lord Camrose and Lord Kemsley (a partnership dissolved in 1937).

=== Member of Parliament ===
He sat as a Conservative Member of Parliament for Tamworth from 1923 to 1929, but resigned to give his seat to Sir Arthur Steel-Maitland, who had been unseated in the election.

=== Public service and honours ===
During the First World War, Iliffe was Controller of the Machine Tool Department at the Ministry of Munitions. For this service he was appointed a Commander of the Order of the British Empire in the 1918 Birthday Honours.

Iliffe was knighted in 1922. On 22 June 1933 he was raised to the peerage as Baron Iliffe, of Yattendon in the County of Berkshire, where he lived at Yattendon Court.

He worked with the Association of the British Chambers of Commerce for many years and was the president of the association in 1932.

During the Second World War, he served as chairman of the Duke of Gloucester's Red Cross and St John Appeal and helped raise more than £50 million, for which he was promoted to Knight Grand Cross of the Order of the British Empire in 1946.

Iliffe also served as president of the Trustees of the Shakespeare Memorial Theatre, Stratford-upon-Avon, from 1933 to 1958, and president of the International Lawn Tennis Club of Great Britain from 1945 to 1959. In 1946 he served as Master of the Worshipful Company of Clockmakers.

In 1937, Iliffe donated Allesley Hall and the surrounding acreage to the Coventry City Council.

=== Personal life ===
Iliffe married Charlotte Gilding, daughter of Henry Gilding, in 1902, and they had two sons and a daughter. He died in July 1960 in London, aged 83, and was succeeded in the barony by his son, Langton.

Parliament of the United Kingdom
Preceded by Sir Percy Wilson Newson	Member of Parliament for Tamworth; 1923–1929	Succeeded by Sir Arthur Ramsay-Steel-Maitland
Peerage of the United Kingdom
New creation	Baron Iliffe; 1933–1960	Succeeded by Langton Iliffe
