= Cambridge News =

Daily newspaper published in Cambridge

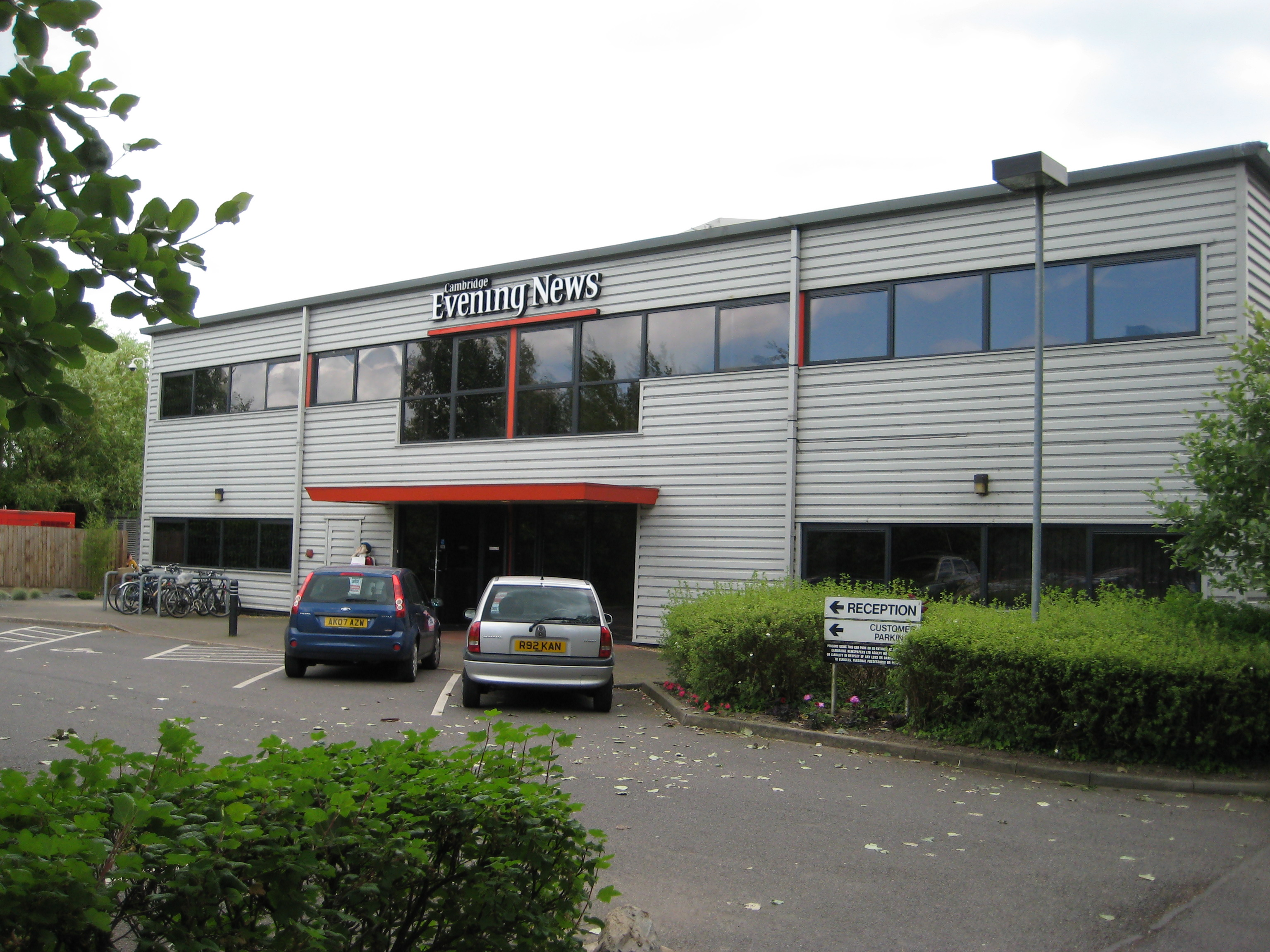
- Cambridge News headquarters
- Type: Daily newspaper
- Format: Tabloid
- Owner: Local World
- Founded: 1888
- Language: English
- Headquarters: Milton, Cambridgeshire
- Circulation: 1,098 (as of 2026)
- Website: cambridge-news.co.uk

The Cambridge News (formerly the Cambridge Evening News) is a British daily newspaper. Published each weekday and on Saturdays, it is distributed from its Milton base. In the period December 2010 – June 2011 it had an average daily circulation of 20,987, but by December 2016 this had fallen to around 13,000. In 2018, the circulation of the newspaper fell to 8,005 and by June 2026 the preceding 6-month average was 1,098.

== History ==
The paper was founded by William Farrow Taylor as the Cambridge Daily News in 1888. The paper was later sold to the Iliffe family, who continued to turn the paper into a profit-making business under the new name of the Cambridge Evening News, starting in 1969. In 2012, Local World acquired the title from Yattendon Group.

Until 2002 the St Neots edition was titled St Neots Evening News and the Huntingdon & St Ives edition Huntingdon and St Ives Evening News for around three years, before reverting to their original names. The editor from February 2008 until April 2016 was Paul Brackley. David Bartlett was appointed editor in June 2016.

On Saturday 13 September 2014, the newspaper was relaunched with a new design, alongside daily paid-for regional editions Hunts News, Royston News and Walden News replacing the free weekly publications.

The 6 December 2017 edition of Cambridge News was noted for a printing error on the front page. The newspaper went to print with a main headline consisting of placeholder text which read "100PT SPLASH HEADING HERE" instead of the intended news story, followed by more filler text contained in a strapline. After images of the cover spread virally on social media, the editor-in-chief apologised to readers and blamed a technical error in the publishing process.

== Awards ==
The paper won Regional Newspaper of the Year at The Newspaper Awards held in 2009 and 2013. This award was part sponsored by its own parent organisation.

== Online media ==
Cambridge News publishes most of its news online via its website, which – as of no later than 2025 – is branded as Cambridgeshire Live. The site can be viewed for free and without registration although the e-edition of the newspaper is behind a paywall.
