= Melody Iliffe =

Australian news presenter

Melody Joy Iliffe
- Born: Melody Joy Welsh; 10 April 1938; Bundaberg, Queensland
- Died: 21 September 2017 (aged 79); Brisbane, Queensland
- Years active: 1964 to 2009
- Known for: Becoming the first woman in Australia to read a prime time television news bulletin
- Television: QTQ-9 News
- Spouse: Jim Iliffe (m. 1964; died 2005)
- Awards: Logie Award (1965)

Melody Joy Iliffe (née Welsh, 10 April 1938 – 21 September 2017) was an Australian Logie Award-winning news presenter.

== Career ==
Iliffe is best remembered for becoming the first woman to co-anchor a prime time news bulletin on Australian television after she was chosen to read the 6pm news alongside Don Seccombe on QTQ-9 in Brisbane in 1964. Welsh had previously been a production assistant on the station's children's program The Channel Niners hosted by "Captain" Jim Iliffe.

She married Jim Iliffe in 1964. They had three children, including David who is now a media veteran himself and a long serving breakfast presenter on ABC Southern Queensland in Toowoomba.

Although she kept a low profile after her marriage, Melody Iliffe regularly appeared in television commercials for Brisbane-based electrical good retailer Chandlers throughout the 1980's. She also co-hosted QTQ-9's 25th anniversary of Queensland television broadcast in 1984 and appeared at the station's 50th anniversary celebration in 2009.

Jim Iliffe died in 2005. Melody Illife died on 21 September 2017. A funeral service was held for her at St Andrew's Anglican Church in Indooroopilly on 29 September 2017. At the time of her death, she had eight grandchildren.

== Logie Award ==
The achievement of being the first female newsreader in Australia was recognised at the Logie Awards of 1965 when Welsh was presented with a special Logie Award for "acknowledged ability, in a man's domain."
