= Stamford Mercury =

Newspaper published in Lincolnshire, England

- Type: Weekly local newspaper
- Owner: Iliffe Media
- Founder(s): Thomas Baily and William Thompson
- Editor: Kerry Coupe
- Founded: 1710 as Stamford Post, 1712 as Stamford Mercury
- Political alignment: Historically Tory, now non-political
- Headquarters: Cherryholt Road, Stamford, Lincolnshire
- Circulation: 4,570 (as of 2022)
- Website: stamfordmercury.co.uk

The Stamford Mercury (also the Lincoln, Rutland and Stamford Mercury, the Rutland and Stamford Mercury, and the Rutland Mercury) based in Stamford, Lincolnshire, England, claims to be "Britain's oldest continuously published newspaper title", although this is disputed by Berrow's Worcester Journal which was established in 1690 and The London Gazette first published in 1665. The Mercury has been published since 1712 but its masthead formerly claimed it was established in 1695 and still has "Britain's Oldest Newspaper".

Three editions (Stamford and The Deepings, Rutland, and Bourne) are published every Friday. The ABC circulation figure in 2011 was 16,675.

== History and ownership ==
Stamford Mercury Limited was acquired by Westminster Press Provincial Newspapers in 1929 and divested to the East Midland Allied Press for £57,500 in 1951. From 1980, it was merged into EMAP Provincial Newspapers and from 1985, it was reorganised into Welland Valley Newspapers.

In 1996, EMAP divested 69 newspapers including the Stamford Mercury to Johnston Press in a deal worth £211 million. In 2007, the Welland Valley stable transferred to fellow group company, East Midlands Newspapers. In 2017, the Mercury along with 12 other publishing titles and associated websites in East Anglia and the East Midlands transferred to Johnston Publishing East Anglia pending disposal of that company to Iliffe Media for a gross cash consideration of £17 million.

An edition of the Mercury from 22 May 1718 is the earliest newspaper in the British Library's newspaper reading room, The Newsroom.

== Archives ==
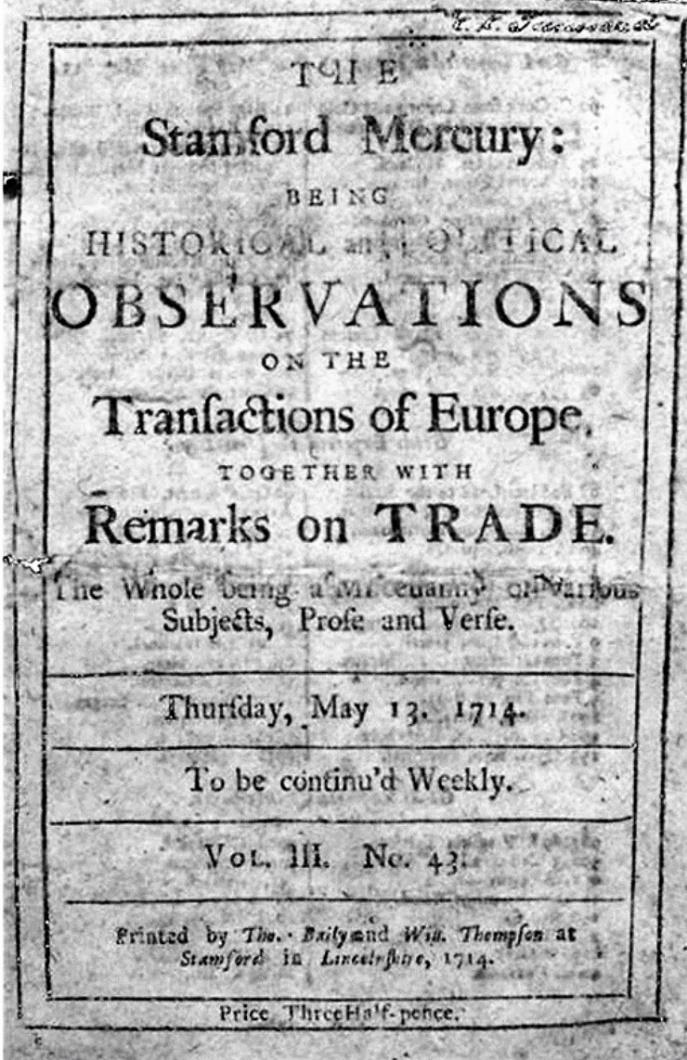
Stamford Mercury of 13 May 1714, the oldest copy held in the Mercury archives

The Mercury possesses the largest archive of any provincial newspaper. It contains over 15,000 newspapers and is complete from the middle of the 18th century. It also holds substantial numbers of annual volumes and individual copies prior to that, dating back to 1714.

Since 2005, the archive has been in the care of the Stamford Mercury Archive Trust (www.smarchive.org.uk). The trust received a grant of £305,000 from the Heritage Lottery Fund to undertake a five-year conservation programme. The trust set out to microfilm every known copy of the Stamford Mercury in existence. Access to the archive is free for personal research. A copy of the complete microfilm run of the paper is available at Stamford Library.

== See also ==
- Peterborough Telegraph
- Lynn News
