= Thomas Wyles =

English schoolmaster (1818–1914)

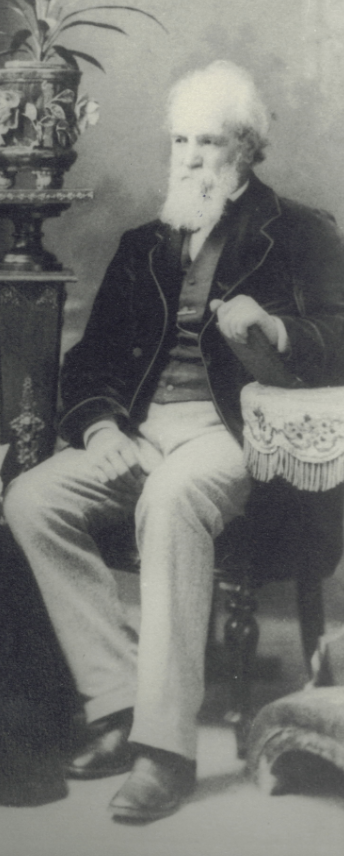
- Born: 22 March 1818; Melbourne, Derbyshire
- Died: 16 November 1914 (aged 96); King's Newton
- Occupation: Schoolmaster
- Spouse: Ann Mary Foord (m. 1839)

Thomas Wyles (22 March 1818 – 16 November 1914) was an English schoolmaster and vegetarianism activist. He was the owner of Allesley Park College in Warwickshire.

== Career ==
Wyles became active in the temperance movement from 1838 and was a pioneer of the United Kingdom Alliance. He was president of the Coventry Temperance Society. He was schoolmaster at Primrose Hill House in Coventry and in 1848 purchased Allesley Park College where he conducted a large resident school until 1886. He moved to Buxton in 1888 and to King's Newton in 1908.

At the age of 91 he guided a group of friends up the Matterhorn in Switzerland. At the age of 92, Wyles stated that he was doing three or four hours hard laborious gardening every day. He was active in his garden until a few days before his death at the age of 96.

== Family ==
He married Ann Mary Foord in 1839 at St. Mary's Parish Church, Chatham. They had eight children.

== Vegetarianism ==
Wyles was a vegetarian for health reasons. He stated that he became a vegetarian to prolong his life. He commented that he consumed nut butter instead of butter from cows and that he lived on a simple diet of brown bread, fruits and vegetables. He liked to eat boiled cabbage. He was a member of the Vegetarian Society and in 1910 was a speaker at their anniversary conference.

== Selected publications ==
- The Duty of the Schoolmaster: In Relation to the Formation of Character (1865)
- Wyles, Thomas (1876). "Physical Science in Schools". Nature. 13 (336): 454–455. Bibcode:1876Natur..13..454W. doi:10.1038/013454a0.
