= Peterborough Herald and Post =

- Type: Defunct Local newspaper
- Format: Tabloid
- Owner: Midland Weekly Media
- Founded: 1989
- Ceased publication: 2008
- Language: English
- Circulation: 96,062 (Adult AIR)

The Peterborough Herald and Post was a weekly freesheet delivered to households in the city of Peterborough, Cambridgeshire, in the United Kingdom. It was run from offices on Cross Street in the city centre, until ceasing operations in 2008.

The Peterborough Standard (established 1872) was published weekly by Sharman Newspapers, under the title Peterborough and Huntingdonshire Standard to 1931. A localised edition was published from 1980 to 1984 and from then titled the Oundle Standard. This amalgamated with free title the New Classified (established 1981) in 1983, briefly publishing as the Classified Standard.

Having expanded to publishing and printing 11 weekly newspapers in the East Anglia region, the publishing side of the business was sold in 1989. Since then Sharman & Co. have been providing newspaper printing services to clients including the major regional publishers, independent local and specialist publishers, corporate communications departments, political parties, foreign language publishers, councils and universities.

The Herald and Post was published from 1989 as a replacement for the Standard. The Oundle Herald and Post was a localised edition published until 1994. The paper was owned by Midland Weekly Media, part of Trinity Mirror. The Stamford Herald and Post, Whittlesey Standard and Deepings Standard were also affected by the closure. An earlier proposal, which would have seen rival Johnston Press purchase the papers, was rejected by the Competition Commission.

== See also ==
- Peterborough Citizen
