= Allesley Park =

Park in Coventry, United Kingdom

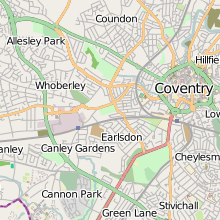
- Allesley Park is located approximately 2.5 miles (4.0 km) northwest of Coventry city centre
- Interactive map of Allesley Park
- Type: Public park
- Location: Coventry, West Midlands, England
- Coordinates: 52.4192°N 1.5606°W
- Operator: Coventry City Council

Allesley Park is a park in Coventry, West Midlands, England. It is also the name of the residential suburb adjacent to the park, which is approximately 2.5 miles (4 km) northwest of Coventry city centre, just east of the A45 Coventry bypass.

== History ==
The park was originally a deer park laid out by Henry de Hastings in the 13th century. It was approximately 5 times larger than the current park. It was later used as a large gentleman's farm of more than 400 acres (1.6 km^{2}) which was owned by the church. In the 1960s, it was bought by Coventry City Council when it was preserved as a public park.

The residential area of Allesley Park was constructed between the 1950s and 1970s and lies directly south of the park, bounded by the districts of Chapelfields to the east, Mount Nod to the west and Whoberley to the south.

== Allesley Hall ==
The first Allesley Hall was built in the mid-17th century, but had been rebuilt before the mid-19th century, when Thomas Wyles purchased it to establish Allesley Park College, which operated until 1886.

The second structure was demolished in 1908, and the present Allesley Hall mansion was built in 1909 for the newspaper magnate Iliffe family. It is now used as a retirement home, but was a sanatorium during the 1950s.
