= Lynn News =

English newspaper

- Type: Local newspaper
- Format: Tabloid
- Owner: Iliffe Media
- Editor: Jeremy Ransome
- Founded: 1944 (1841)
- Language: English
- Circulation: 202,518 (as of 2022)
- Website: lynnnews.co.uk

The Lynn News is an English newspaper published by Iliffe Media and appearing each Tuesday and Friday in King's Lynn, Norfolk, England.

== History and ownership ==
The origins of the paper go back to the founding of the Lynn Advertiser in 1841 and the Lynn News and County Press in 1856. After 89 years of rivalry, the two papers merged in 1944, subsequently publishing as the Lynn News and Advertiser until 1985. Originally published as the Lynn Advertiser and West Norfolk Herald, the publication changed its name to the Lynn Advertiser, Norfolk and Cambridgeshire Herald in 1861 and the Wisbech Constitutional Gazette was incorporated in 1868. In 1923, the proprietor, Thew and Son, merged with the rival Lynn News Company.

The East Midland Allied Press was formed in 1947 by merger of the Northamptonshire Printing and Publishing Company, the Peterborough Advertiser Company, the West Norfolk and King's Lynn Newspaper Company and commercial printing sections at Rushden, King's Lynn and Bury St. Edmunds. It was overseen by Pat Winfrey, the son of Sir Richard Winfrey, who had bought the Spalding Guardian in 1887. After 49 years, EMAP divested 69 newspapers including West Norfolk Newspapers to Johnston Press in 1996.

In 2017, the Lynn News along with 12 other publishing titles and associated websites in East Anglia and the East Midlands transferred to Johnston Publishing East Anglia pending disposal of that company to Iliffe Media for a gross cash consideration of £17 million. Since then, it has been printed in Cambridge.

== See also ==
- Peterborough Telegraph
- Stamford Mercury
