= Peterborough Telegraph =

Local newspaper for Peterborough, UK

- Type: Local newspaper
- Format: Tabloid
- Owner: National World
- Editor: Nigel Thornton (print); Carly Roberts (digital)
- Founded: 1948
- Language: English
- Circulation: 4,062 (as of 2023)
- Website: peterboroughtoday.co.uk

The Peterborough Telegraph, or PT as it is known locally (formerly the Peterborough Evening Telegraph or ET), is the local newspaper for the city of Peterborough, Cambridgeshire, in the United Kingdom. It is based at New Priestgate House in the city centre.

Since 2012, the renamed Peterborough Telegraph has been a weekly title, published every Thursday morning with local news, sport, business and information. The final daily paper was published on Saturday, 26 May. Previously, the Evening Telegraph was published in full colour on Monday to Saturday mornings with supplements: jobs (Thursday), property (Wednesday), motors and entertainment (both Friday) and a lifestyle magazine ET Life on Saturday. Sister paper, the Peterborough Citizen, is distributed every Thursday with a round-up of the week's content. An accompanying iPad football app was launched at the time of the change to a weekly print cycle.

== History and ownership ==
The paper began in 1948 as localised edition of the Northamptonshire Evening Telegraph, founded in Kettering in 1897, with four change pages. From 1961 it was published in Peterborough from the Advertiser's offices in Cumbergate. A district edition was published between 1966 and 1967, entitled Stamford Evening Telegraph from 1987 to 1988, continuing as a general county edition with seven change pages.

The East Midland Allied Press was formed in 1947 by merger of the Northamptonshire Printing and Publishing Company, the Peterborough Advertiser Company, the West Norfolk and King's Lynn Newspaper Company and commercial printing sections at Rushden, King's Lynn and Bury St. Edmunds. It was overseen by Pat Winfrey, the son of Sir Richard Winfrey, who had bought the Spalding Guardian in 1887. After 49 years, EMAP divested 69 newspapers including the Peterborough Evening Telegraph Company to Johnston Press in 1996.

JPIMedia (formerly Johnston Press) and its subsidiaries (including East Midlands Newspapers) were acquired by National World in 2021. In 2025, Media Concierge, owner of Iconic Newspapers, acquired National World for £65.1 million.

Significant stories given in-depth coverage by the newspaper include the murder of Ross Parker and the Peterborough ditch murders.

== Citizen and Advertiser ==
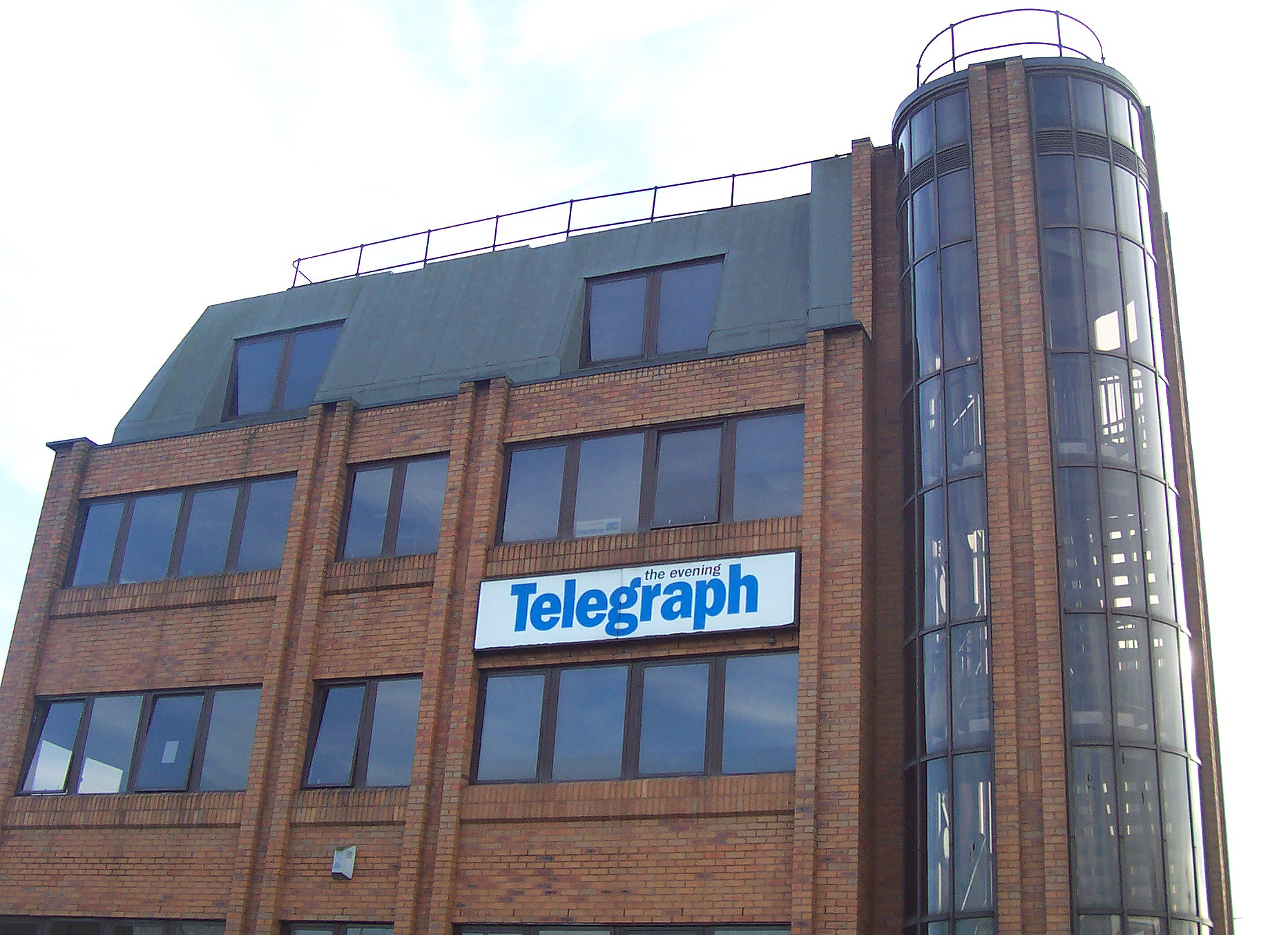
New Priestgate House, Peterborough

The Peterborough Advertiser (established 1854) amalgamated with the Peterborough Citizen (established 1898) in 1946, subsequently publishing as Peterborough Citizen and Advertiser until 1976. For much of its life it had localised editions for Huntingdonshire, Isle of Ely, city and county. The Advertiser was published monthly until 1855, when it appeared under the title Peterborough Weekly News and General Advertiser and in 1898 it began to appear twice weekly. The Wednesday edition was subsequently titled the Citizen. It was in fact always the Advertiser's midweek edition, which did not attain its own title until 1903. Previously it had been published as Peterborough Advertiser and South Midland Times (Wednesday series). This became a free title in 1977, initially as the Peterborough Advertiser, but now as the Citizen. From 1909 to 1914 there existed a Saturday sports edition of the Wednesday paper called the Saturday Citizen. This was briefly titled Citizen Football Edition from 1913.

== See also ==
- Peterborough Herald and Post
- Stamford Mercury
- Lynn News
