= Graeme Brown (journalist) =

British journalist

Graeme Brown is a British newspaper journalist and the current editor of the Birmingham Mail, editor-in-chief of the Birmingham Post, the Sunday Mercury, and their sister website BirminghamLive.

== Background ==
Brown graduated from Coventry University.

== Career ==
Brown began his journalism career in 2004 as a business reporter for the Stoke-on-Trent daily The Sentinel where, in 2008, he became deputy business editor.

In 2009, he became deputy regional head of business at Birmingham Post & Mail (BPM) titles Birmingham Post, Birmingham Mail and Sunday Mercury.

In 2013, he became head of business at these titles and in 2015, he became editor of agenda and business. In 2016, he became executive editor in the same capacity. During this period, Brown facilitated the launch of Black Country Live.

In November 2019, he was unveiled by Reach plc as editor of the Coventry Telegraph and its Coventry Live sister website.

In October 2020, Brown was appointed by Reach plc as the company's Senior Editor in Birmingham, the Black Country and Worcestershire. He led the coverage of the Birmingham Commonwealth Games in 2022, after the Birmingham Mail campaigned for the event to be held in the city.

In 2023, BirminghamLive won in the communities and campaigning categories of the Regional Press Awards. It won a quarter of the team awards in 2025, including the communities award again.

In 2024, under Brown's leadership, BirminghamLive became the largest regional publisher in the UK.

== Television ==
Brown makes regular television appearances to discuss current affairs, including on Sky Press Preview, the BBC News channel and ITV's This Morning.

He is a regular guest on Channel 5's The Jeremy Vine Show and has featured since 2020.
