= Graham Brown (Australian cricketer) =

Australian cricketer

Personal information
- Full name: Graham Campbell Brown
- Born: 9 May 1944; Melbourne, Australia
- Died: 5 November 2023 (aged 79)

Domestic team information
- Years: Team
- 1964: Victoria
- Source: Cricinfo, 5 December 2015

Graham Campbell Brown (9 May 1944 – 5 November 2023) was an Australian cricketer. He played one first-class cricket match for Victoria in 1964.

== See also ==
- List of Victoria first-class cricketers
