= Graham Brown (footballer, born 1950) =

English footballer

Personal information
- Full name: Graham Frederick Brown
- Date of birth: 5 November 1950 (age 75)
- Place of birth: Leicester, England
- Position: Goalkeeper

Youth career
- –1968: Leicester City

Senior career*
Years	Team	Apps	(Gls)
1968–1970	Leicester City	2	(0)
1970–????	Burton Albion		
Total		2	(0)
- * Club domestic league appearances and goals

Graham Frederick Brown (born 5 November 1950) is an English former professional footballer who played as a goalkeeper in the Football League for Leicester City and in non-League football for Burton Albion.
