= Jim Iliffe =

Australian radio and television personality

Jim Iliffe (23 April 1922 – 25 June 2005) was an Australian radio and television personality.

== Early life ==
James "Jim" Iliffe was born at Croydon, New South Wales on 23 April 1922.

== Service in World War II ==
Although only 17 years of age at the outbreak of World War II, he claimed he was 18 and joined the 33rd Fortress Company, Royal Australian Engineers. He transferred to the AIF as a Corporal, later becoming a Sergeant. He was sent to Singapore in May 1941 and was at Kluang on the Malay Peninsula when Japan entered the war. The Australian troops, aided by British and Indian, were to hold the line against the Japanese advance. The Japanese strategy was to land south of the allied positions, causing a continual retreat for the allies. Iliffe was wounded in the leg by shrapnel shortly before the unit made it back to Singapore.

He was being treated at an unofficial hospital in the Singapore Town Hall when he heard that the British were due to surrender the following day. He and several others made it to the docks and managed to steal some food supplies and a 16-foot boat. They sailed for three nights across open sea, and soon after landing on an island were found by a group of Dutch soldiers. One of the last to board a Dutch evacuation ship, he was transported to Perth and later Melbourne. He convalesced in a Sydney hospital, and arrived home a month after Singapore had fallen.

Jim Iliffe was interviewed by Suzanne Mulligan in May 2002 about his service during the fall of Singapore during the Second World War. The oral history is now held by the State Library of Queensland. Iliffe died in 2005.

== Media career ==
Jim Iliffe opened Brisbane's first radio and TV school, AIR-TV, in 1952 while working as a radio announcer.

He played a significant role in early Australian television, starting on the second day of broadcasts in August 1959. Billed as "Captain" Jim Iliffe, he presented The Channel Niners children's program for fifteen years.

He married Melody Welsh(who went on to become a well known personality in her own right) on 16 November 1963 and they had three children, Christopher, Ingrid and David. Melody died on 21 September 2017.
