= Basildon Park =

Historic house museum in West Berkshire, England

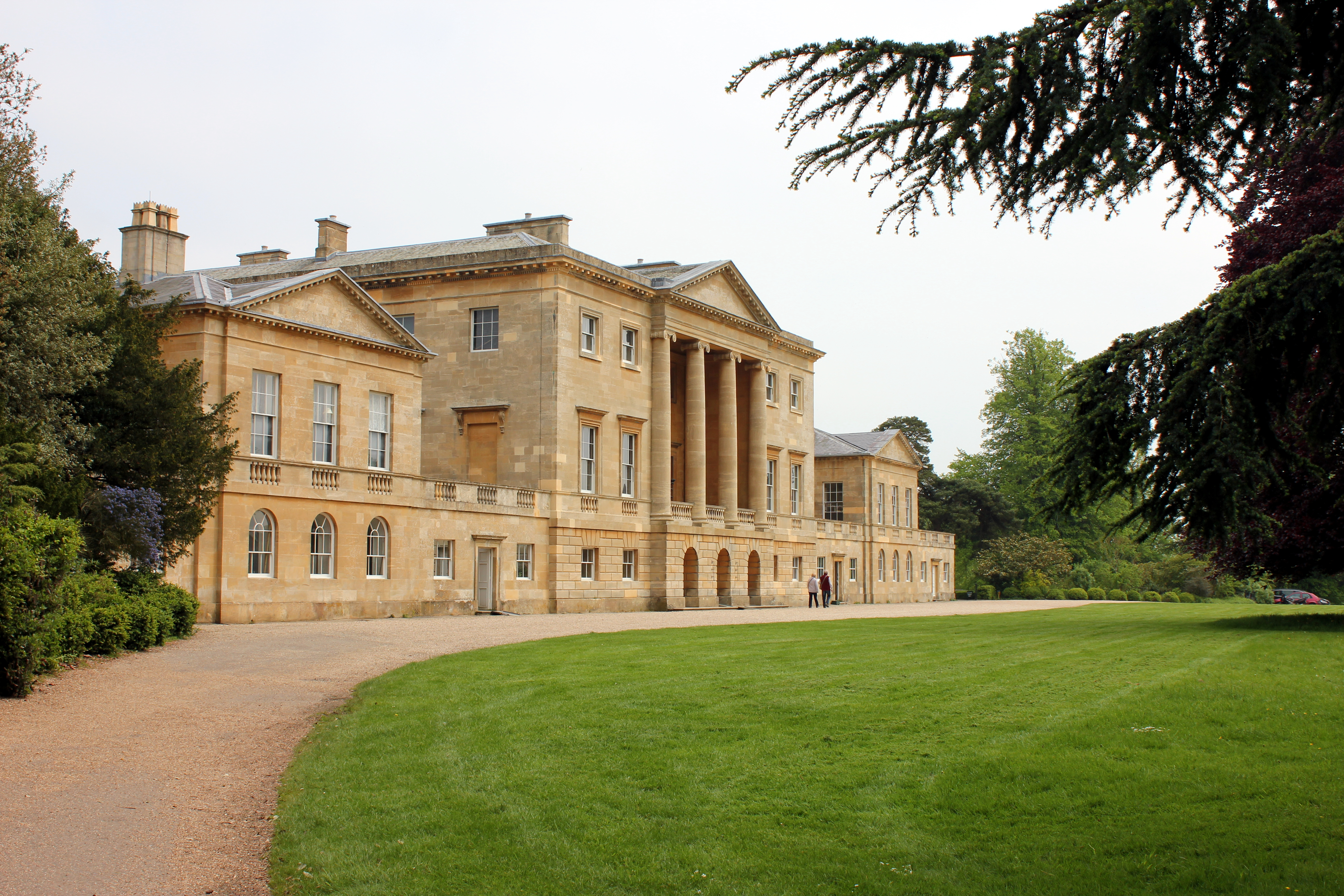
- Basildon Park, the West façade—the corps de logis and north and south flanking pavilions

- Location within Berkshire

General information
- Architectural style: Palladian
- Location: Lower Basildon, Berkshire, England
- Coordinates: 51.4989°N 1.12274°W
- Construction started: 1776; 250 years ago
- Client: Sir Francis Sykes, 1st Baronet
- Owner: National Trust

Technical details
- Grounds: 400 acres (160 ha)

Design and construction
- Architect: John Carr

Listed Building – Grade I
- Official name: Basildon Park
- Designated: 14 April 1967
- Reference no.: 1221097

National Register of Historic Parks and Gardens
- Official name: Basildon Park
- Designated: 30 September 1987
- Reference no.: 1000581

Basildon Park is a country house situated 2 miles (3 kilometres) south of Goring-on-Thames and Streatley in Berkshire, between the villages of Upper Basildon and Lower Basildon. It is owned by the National Trust and is a Grade I listed building. The house was built between 1776 and 1783 for Sir Francis Sykes and designed by John Carr in the Palladian style at a time when Palladianism was giving way to the newly fashionable neoclassicism. Thus, the interiors are in a neoclassical "Adamesque" style.

Never fully completed, the house passed through a succession of owners. In 1910 it was standing empty and during WW1 Major James Archibald Morrison allowed the house to be used as an army convalescent hospital. It was again sold in 1928 and quickly sold again. In 1929, following a failed attempt to dismantle and rebuild the house in the US, it was stripped of many of its fixtures and fittings and all but abandoned.

During World War II, the house was requisitioned and served as a barracks, a training ground for tanks, and finally a prisoner of war camp—all activities unsuited to the preservation of an already semi-derelict building. In 1952, a time when hundreds of British country houses were being demolished, it was said of Basildon Park "to say it was derelict, is hardly good enough, no window was left intact and most were repaired with cardboard or plywood."

Today, Basildon Park is as notable for its mid-twentieth-century renaissance and restoration, by Lord and Lady Iliffe, as it is for its architecture. In 1978, the Iliffes gave the house, together with its park and a large endowment for its upkeep, to the National Trust in the hope that "The National Trust will protect it and its park for future generations to enjoy."

== History ==
=== Early history ===
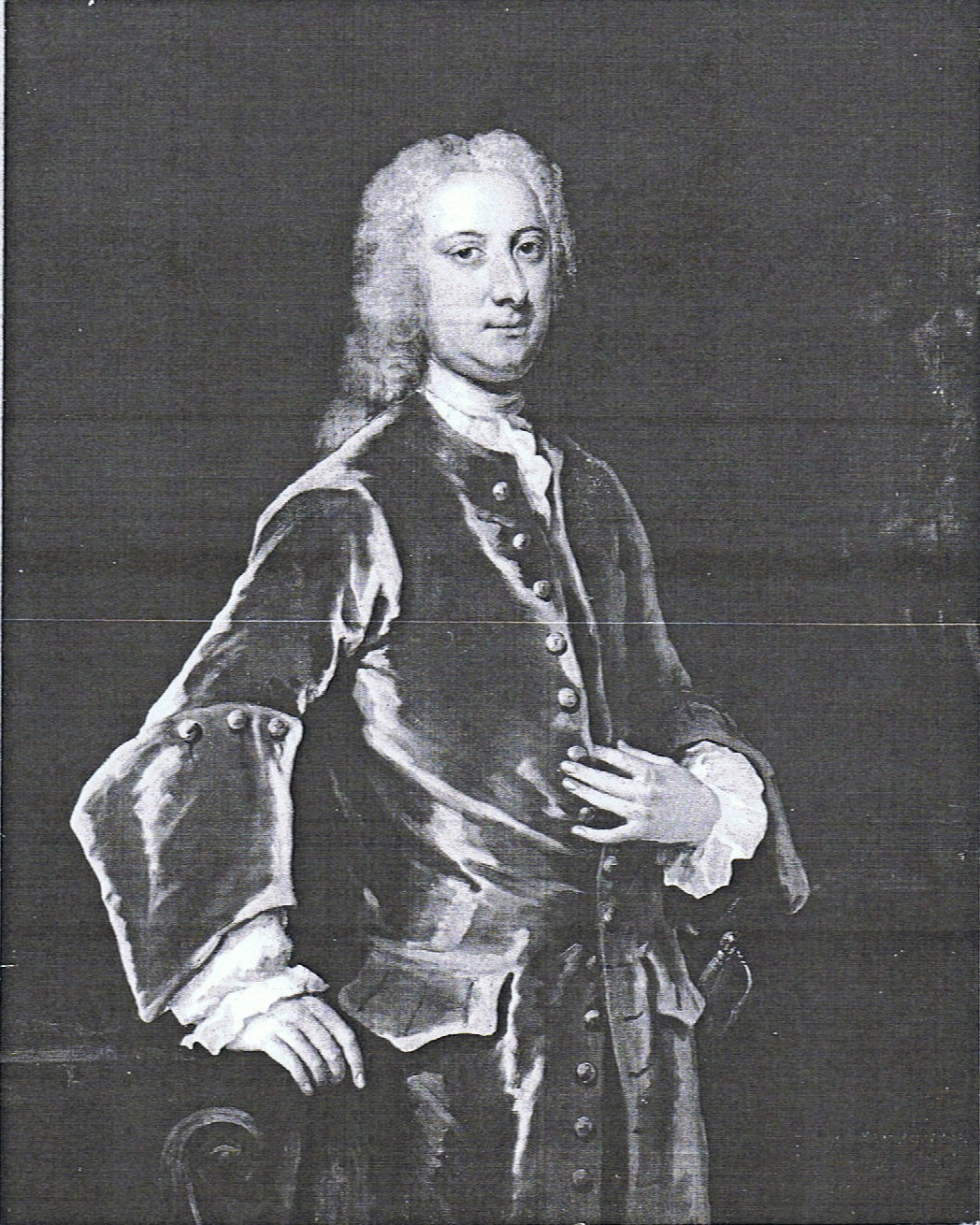
Charles Fane, (1676–1744), created Viscount Fane in 1718. Inherited Basildon from his father Sir Henry Fane, in 1705/6. His wife, who died in 1762, built the renowned grotto at the riverside New House, which also served as the mansion's dower house.

Basildon is first documented in 1311 when it was granted by the crown to Elias de Colleshull. During the 16th and early 17th centuries, the manor of Basildon was held by the Yonge family. In 1654, the Basildon estate was purchased probably on behalf of Royalist Colonel George Fane by his brother-in-law Henry Bourchier, 5th Earl of Bath who died the same year (confusion as to for whom bought was caused by the political state of the country at the time and by George Fane's premature death). Lord Bath's widow, the former Lady Rachael Fane, bequeathed the estate to her nephew Sir Henry Fane, George Fane's son. Little is known of Basildon during the Fane ownership, but a mansion house was built with Gothic lodges. These lodges survive and serve the present house. The manor remained a Fane possession until it was offered for sale in 1766 by the heirs of Charles, 2nd Viscount Fane, namely, his two married sisters Dorothy Montagu and Mary de Salis.

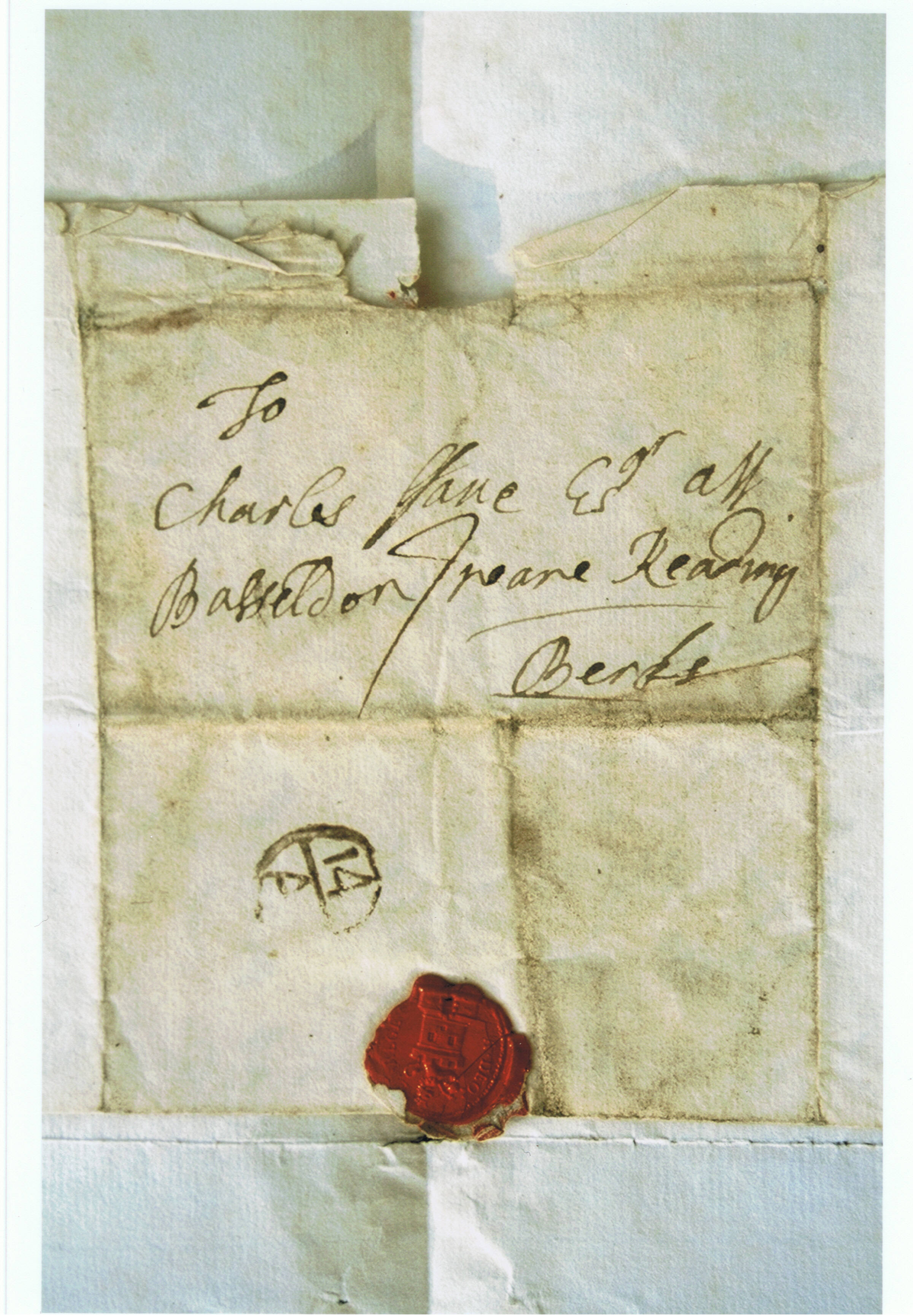
_{Cover of a letter: To Charles ffane, Esq., att Basseldon, neare Reading, Berks, April 1714.}

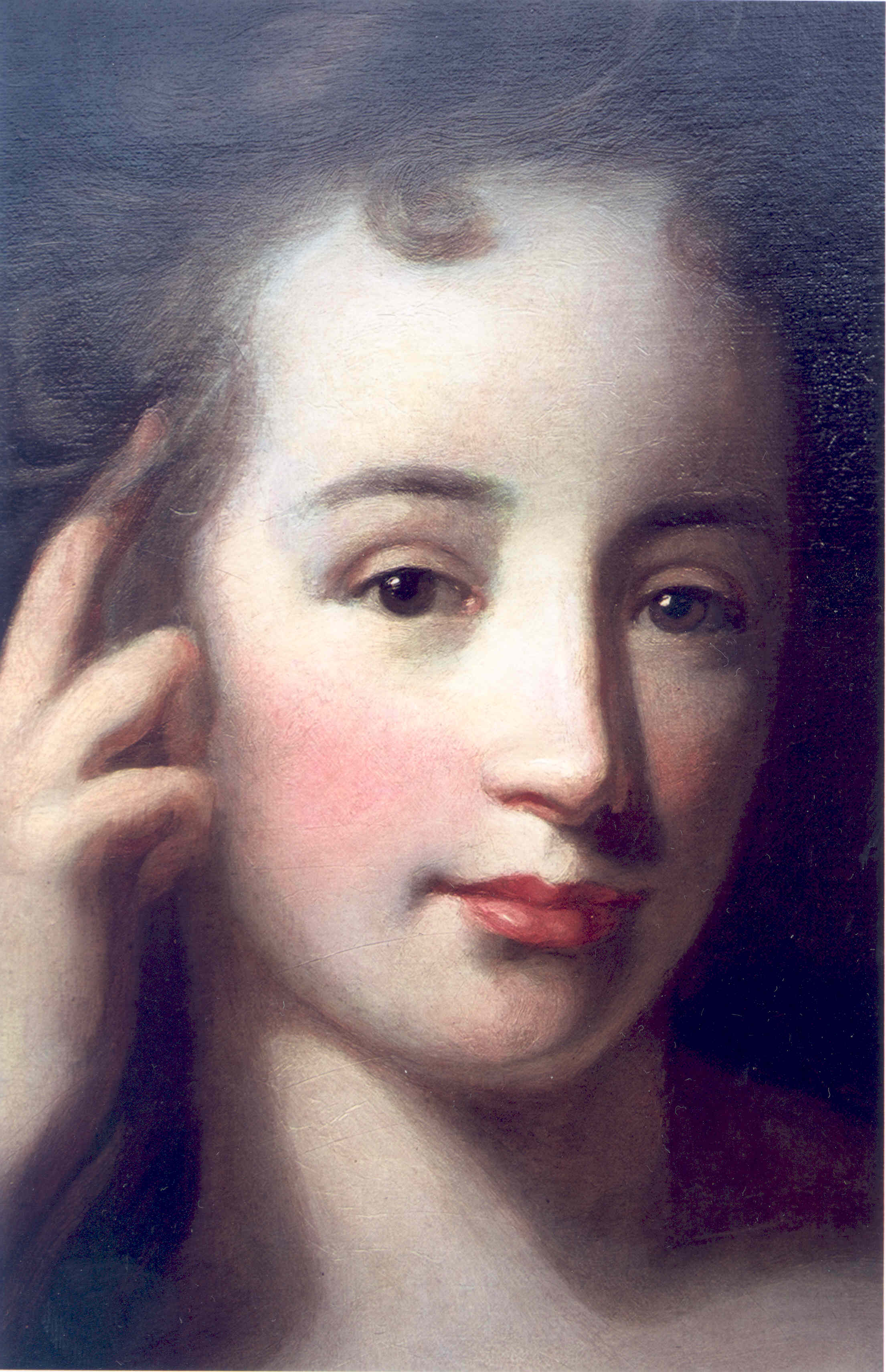
_{Viscountess Fane (1686–1762). Mary Stanhope, sister of James Stanhope, who married Charles, 1st Viscount Fane in 1707, and was thus associated with Basildon for 55 years.}

The estate was purchased in 1771 by Sir Francis Sykes. Having made a fortune in India, Sykes returned to England to realise his social and political ambitions. For these to be fulfilled, Sykes required a grand estate conveniently close to London; he built Basildon Park to serve that purpose.

=== 18th century ===
Basildon Park was built for Sir Francis Sykes. Born in the West Riding of Yorkshire in 1732, the son of a yeoman farmer, he left his native country to make his fortune in India. He joined the British East India Company and amassed a fortune in Bengal, at the court of the Nawab. He later became Governor of Kasimbazar and became what was then known as a nabob, a title derived from the Indian "Nawab."

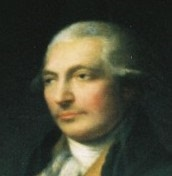
Sir Francis Sykes, for whom Basildon Park was built.

Returning to England in 1769, possessed of vast wealth (estimated at between £250,000 and £500,000) he purchased Ackworth Park in his native Yorkshire. In 1770, he acquired the Gillingham Manor estate, Dorset, an estate of some 2,200 acres (8.9 km^{2}). This purchase enabled him to become Member of Parliament for the constituency of Shaftesbury. To further his political aspirations he required a house suitable for entertaining and indicative of his wealth conveniently nearer to London than the distant counties of Yorkshire and Dorset.

Basildon fitted Sykes' requirement well, not only politically, but also socially. At this time this area of Berkshire was home to so many of the newly rich returned from India that it was referred to as "the English Hindoostan." Sykes' close friend Warren Hastings was already resident in the area, and another friend, the 1st Lord Clive, (better known as Clive of India) had himself attempted to buy Basildon in 1767.

From the moment Sykes purchased the Basildon site in 1771, his good fortune changed. The commencement of work on the house was delayed until 1776 as a result of the crash of the East India Company's shares, which caused Sykes to lose £10,000 in a single day. Shortly afterwards, his and Clive's activities as part of the Bengal Administration were investigated by Parliament. Sykes as the Bengali Tax Collector had levied unjust taxes and was publicly censured. Two years later, in 1774, while Sykes was still a subject of public opprobrium, his finances suffered further when allegations of corruption pertaining to his constituency were made against him. As a result, he lost his parliamentary seat and was forced to pay £11,000 in compensation.

Finally, in 1776, work on Basildon began and lasted for the remainder of Sykes' life. Although his finances continued to dwindle and he was throughout his life to be vilified as an "archetypal nabob", he managed to regain his political and social lives. He was created a baronet in 1781, and became MP for Wallingford in 1784. As Sykes aged, work on Basildon slowed. This may have been for financial reasons or just because of a lack of momentum due to family disappointments. A younger son was drowned in 1786 and Sykes' heir proved to be dissipated and a further drain on Sykes' resources.

Sykes died at his London house on 11 January 1804. His body was returned to Basildon for burial in St Bartholomew's Church, Lower Basildon. and placed in a previously owned 14th century chest tomb. At Basildon Park, the principal rooms remained unfinished.

=== 19th century ===
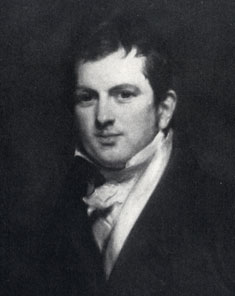
The entrepreneur James Morrison. His ownership of the mansion saw it completed and filled with treasures.

On Sir Francis Sykes' death, Basildon was inherited by his son, Sir Francis Sykes (2nd Baronet) who died a few weeks later. The house then passed to his grandson, the five-year-old Sir Francis (3rd Baronet). By this time, the Sykes fortune was almost spent and Basildon was already mortgaged. The family finances suffered further as a result of the 3rd Baronet's association with the extravagant Prince Regent. Aged just 14, he entertained the Prince at Basildon. As a result of the Prince's occupation of the North side of the second floor, where the best bedrooms are located, for many years afterwards this range of rooms were known as "The Regent's Side" as opposed to the family's less formal rooms on the South side of the floor.

From the late 1820s, Sykes was suffering serious financial problems, and in 1829, the estate was placed on the market. The house was not quickly sold, as Sykes refused to accept any price less than £100,000. During this period, the house was often let. However, Sykes and his family were in residence between 1834 and 1835 when the future Prime Minister Benjamin Disraeli was a house-guest at Basildon. Disraeli, who was the lover of Sykes' wife Henrietta, immortalised her along with some descriptions of Basildon and its rooms in his novel, Henrietta Temple. Another romantic attachment of Lady Sykes was to result in her husband being immortalised in a novel, this time in a less flattering light. Lady Sykes had been conducting an affair with the painter Daniel Maclise. Her husband publicly denounced Maclise, causing an unacceptable high society scandal. As a result, Charles Dickens, a friend of Maclise, then writing Oliver Twist, based his villainous and cruel character Bill Sikes on Sir Francis.

In 1838, as Oliver Twist was published, Sykes, out of funds and publicly humiliated, finally sold Basildon Park for just £3,000 less than the £100,000 he had been seeking.

Basildon's interiors were now finally completed and the estate had a seventy-year period of security. The new owner was James Morrison, a Hampshire born, self-made millionaire. From humble beginnings as an employee of a London haberdasher, he had married his employer's daughter, entered into partnership with his father-in-law and expanded the business. By 1820, Morrison was possessed of a fortune he was investing wisely to become one of Victorian England's wealthiest men. A politician, between 1830 and 1847, he was one time MP for St Ives, Ipswich and the Inverness Burghs.

In addition to Basildon, Morrison owned several estates, including Fonthill and Islay. The mansions provided a setting for his huge art collection, which included works by John Constable, J. M. W. Turner and many Italian and Dutch old masters. Basildon was to be the setting for some of his finest works.

To create that setting, Morrison employed the architect John Buonarotti Papworth. At Basildon, Papworth combined the roles of architect and interior decorator, helping to create what Morrison described as "a casket for my pictorial gems." Many of Papworth's more ambitious plans were not realised; the demolition and replacement by colonnades of the yards, the conversion of a courtyard into a sculpture gallery, and the creation of a carriage ramp to the piano nobile on the East front were all declined by Morrison. However, the house was fitted up with a hot water system and fire precautions, and the decoration of the principal reception rooms was completed in suitably classical styles.

Morrison died at Basildon on 30 October 1857.

=== 20th century ===
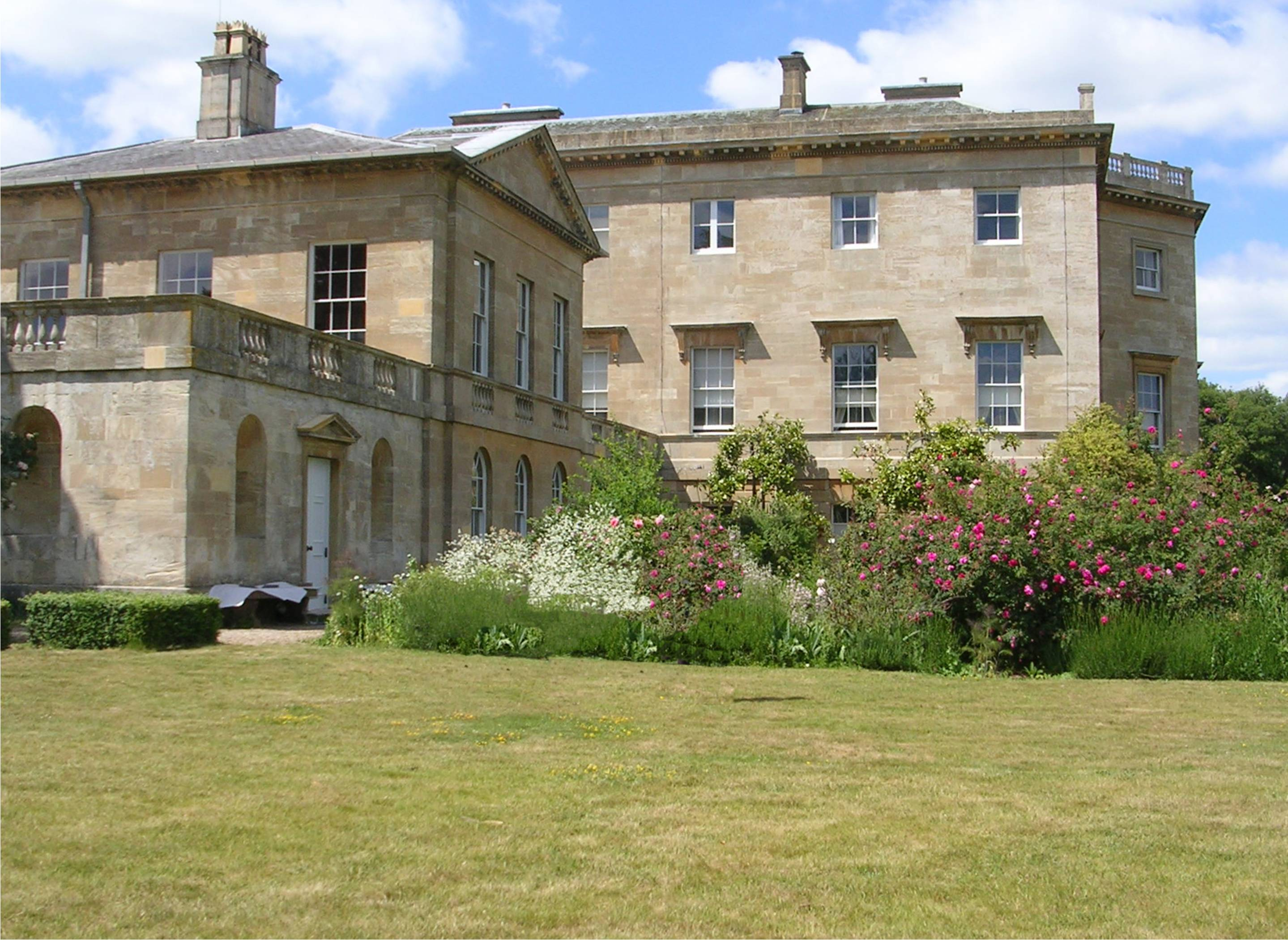
The South Pavilion and corps de logis. In 1978, the South Pavilion (the former laundry) was converted into a private house for Lord and Lady Iliffe following their donation of the main house to the National Trust.

Basildon Park was occupied by James Morrison's unmarried daughter, Ellen, until her death in 1910. Her demise marked the beginning of a downward turn in Basildon's history. The house and estate were inherited by a nephew, Major James Archibald Morrison. Initially, he improved the estate and its buildings, commissioning the architect Edwin Lutyens to design workers' cottages in the neighbouring villages. However, he never occupied the house, using it only for occasional shooting parties. During WW1 Major Morrison allowed the house to be used as a convalescent home for injured soldiers and it suffered the attendant damage which accompanies institutional use.

During the war Basildon's owner served with distinction, obtaining the DSO and, according to Harold Macmillan, always "insisted on walking rather than crawling under enemy fire." Surprisingly, considering the form in which his courage manifested itself, Morrison survived the war. However, his love of shooting, a lavish lifestyle and three marriages led to such a serious decline in his fortunes that in 1929, he was forced to sell the Basildon estate.

The new purchaser was the 1st Lord Iliffe. He wished to expand and consolidate his estate at nearby Yattendon, where he had built a new house. He immediately annexed the estate from house and park back, stripped the mansion of some doors and fireplaces for his London house, and placed the house back on the market.

Thus it was that in 1929 Basildon Park was purchased by a property developer, George Ferdinando. who bought the estate as park land. George Ferdinando was 65 when he bought the house and as his children were grown up his wife was unwilling to take on another large house and so he produced a sales notice, the idea being to sell the house as one lot in America. Encouraged by the then current fashion amongst wealthy American citizens for inhabiting ancient European houses and palazzi, Ferdinando produced a sales brochure advertising Basildon to any American citizen for $1,000,000. For this sum, he promised to "carefully take it down" and "re-erect in America", thus providing an opportunity to "Any patriotic American wishing to benefit his native state by presenting this imposing building … ready for occupation as a private residence, museum, college building or public library." Fortunately he had a change of heart and decided instead to convert the old sawmill at the top of the park into a house for himself and his wife. George also persuaded one of his sons Eric to return from America where he was a cotton grower with his young family to live in the south pavilion then called the east wing. Eric then oversaw the return of fixtures and fittings such as the stair balustrade, the renovation and running of the house and estate. No evidence is available to say whether it was George Ferdinando, the first Lord Iliffe or the executors of the Morrison estate who sold off the dining room fixtures. However elements from the Dining Room have been reused in the Waldorf-Astoria Hotel in New York and doorcases designed by John Carr are in the Metropolitan Museum of Art, the Boston Museum of Fine Arts, and the Louisiana State University Museum of Art.

World War II saw Basildon used as a billet for troops, while the park became a training ground for troops deployed in tank and ground warfare. George Ferdinando continued to live at Basildon during this time. Eric served in the navy during the war and on his return set about mending the walls that had been damaged by bridging units used on the river and the huge holes left in the demolition area. The house was then requisitioned for the Ministry of Works, whose caretaker stole the lead from the roofs. He was caught and imprisoned for two years. Unfortunately the ministry were only willing to pay back one tenth of the cost of the repair to the roof and other damage done including a fire. Having lived at Basildon now for twenty years George moved to Shoreham-by-Sea in Sussex where he died in 1949, but was buried in Basildon. Unable to foot the cost of repairing the house and the inheritance tax the house had to be sold and Eric and family moved to the converted barn house formerly part of the estate. The second Lord Iliffe, who lived in the area, visited the house at this point which was in rather a sad state. However, encouraged by the potential she saw in the mansion, Lady Iliffe persuaded her husband to buy it. This was the beginning of Basildon Park's salvation and renaissance.

Under the direction of the Iliffes (later the 2nd Baron and Lady Iliffe), Basildon was completely restored and refurnished. This was achieved over a period of 25 years. Many fixtures and fittings were purchased from similar houses in a greater state of dereliction prior to their demolition. While often the Iliffes found great bargains, obtaining 18th-century mahogany doors and marble fireplaces, at other times their luck was less favourable; Lady Iliffe recalled attending the Mentmore Towers auction of 1975 with the intention of buying marble topped console tables for Basildon, but through economic necessity returned with only a coal-scuttle.

== Architectural appraisal ==
The corps de logis at the centre of the West façade.

Basildon Park was begun in 1772; the architect, John Carr of York, was one of the leading architects in northern England. His work was initially influenced by the Palladian architects, the Earl of Burlington and William Kent and later by the neoclassicism of Robert Adam. At Basildon, Carr's most southerly commission, both these architectural influences can be discerned. It has been speculated that the principal façade, the West Front, was inspired by Palladio's Villa Emo. Whatever the inspiration, it was one Carr relied on heavily in his work, and it can be seen again most evidently in his designs for Newark Town Hall.

The mansion consists of the three quite separate blocks, but indistinctly so. The three floored corps de logis contains the principal rooms, and two flanking pavilions of two floors each; the north designed to contain the Kitchen, Scullery and Housekeeper's Room and the south to contain the Laundry and Dairy. The upper floor of each pavilion contained accommodation for servants. This arrangement, of a central block flanked by pavilions, is original to Palladio's concept; however, in England Palladianism (a form of architecture based only loosely on Palladio's concepts) had evolved to a point that where Palladio had filled the distance between corps de logis and the flanking blocks with a void space or colonnade. The evolved 18th-century Palladianism usually filled the space with long wings containing enfilades of rooms. At Basildon, the architect used windowed walls to create service courts in the void. This had the double advantage of not only unifying the façade, but also (in a comparatively small mansion) of creating a discrete space for utilitarian stores, lavatories and the drying of clothes.

=== Exterior ===
Basildon Park, the East front.

The principal façade is the long West façade of the corps de logis and its flanking pavilions. Built of Bath stone, the three-storied rectangular corps de logis has a rusticated ground floor, with a piano nobile above and a bedroom floor above this. This block is of seven bays; the central three bays are behind a recessed Ionic portico. Entrance to the mansion is by three segmented arches under the portico, or more formally, by climbing a double curved staircase behind the three arches. The stairs rise to an open loggia beneath the portico which gives access to the mansion's principal entrance. The fenestration is designed to indicate the status of their floor. Thus, small windows indicate the domestic ground floor and secondary upper floor, while the windows of the first floor piano nobile are tall and large. These larger windows are unified along the full length of the façade extending on to the pavilions by a balustrading beneath them which continues the line of the balustrading protecting the central loggia. The roofline is concealed by a high parapet concealing the roofs themselves and broken only by the portico's pediment. This pediment is echoed as a smaller pediment over both of the two-storied pavilions.

In contrast to the Palladianism of the West front, the East front is austere in its neoclassicism. It projects from the flanking pavilions, which on this side of the house are partially screened by planting. The fenestration which is concentrated on the broad bay at the centre of the façade provides the essential rhythm and relief. Above the second floor, a balustrade not only hides the roof, but unites the projecting bay with its flanking bays.

=== Interior ===
The corps de logis (central block) is built on the three floors. In the 18th century, such floors (known, because of their outer brickwork, as "the Rustic") would have been used by both the owners and their servants. The Rustic contained the wine cellars, Servants' Hall, estate offices, and secondary reception rooms. This is very much the case at Basildon where the former Servants' Hall is now the ground floor visitors' tea room and the former Summer Breakfast Room (beneath the Octagon Drawing Room) which later saw service as a billiard room, is now a lecture room for the mansion's paying visitors. The lower hall, beneath the first floor hall, was the everyday entrance to the mansion for the family.

The first floor. 1: The four service courts; 2: Portico and West front; 3: North Pavilion; 4: South Pavilion; 5: Entrance Hall; 6: Staircase Hall; 7: Octagon Drawing Room; 8: Dining Room; 9: Study; 10: Library; 11: Sutherland Room (formerly lady Iliffe's sitting room); 12: Kitchen (since 1952); 13: larder (?); 14: Green Drawing Room (formerly Breakfast or Small Dining Room).

=== The first floor ===
The first floor was designed to be a piano nobile (meaning literally a "noble floor"); as its name suggests, it contains the principal rooms of the house. During the 1770s, when Basildon was built, a domestic and architectural movement from formality towards informality was in progress. Thus, while the exterior of Basildon is pure symmetry, this symmetry is not reflected in the interior layout of the rooms as would have been the case just a few years earlier. In any case, the builder of Basildon was not eminent enough to require a suite of state apartments on the piano nobile in permanent expectation of a royal visit. Thus, in keeping with this newly found spirit of informality Basildon has no formal and symmetrical enfilade of rooms of increasing splendour, but two separate first floor suites, one feminine and one masculine, were placed on either side of the hall. The library (10 on plan), considered a masculine room, was placed next to the owner Sir Francis Sykes' dressing room (9) while on the opposite side of the hall (11 and 12) were the bedroom and dressing room of Lady Sykes. Sir Francis appears not to have had a bedroom on this floor, an arrangement not uncommon in the 18th century, when a dressing room served as a study and reception room combined—the owner would descend from his bedroom above to the dressing room and receive business callers while the finishing touches were made to his dressing by a servant. Lady Sykes' dressing room or boudoir (11 on first floor plan), also used as private sitting room by the late Lady Iliffe, is now known as the Sutherland Room; it is currently used to display some of the studies by the 20th-century artist Graham Sutherland for his tapestry "Christ in Glory" at Coventry Cathedral.

The principal receptions are a communicating circuit of rooms designed for entertaining. This was a late 18th-century feature, first introduced by the architect Matthew Brettingham in 1750.

The Hall is the principal entrance to the house which would have been used by any eminent guests; entering the house by climbing the double staircase beneath the portico the guest immediately sees, through a gilded doorcase, a short enfilade through the staircase hall to the Octagon drawing room. While the hall in its use was not comparable with the Great Hall of earlier manor houses, it was still more than a mere entrance vestibule; in the 18th century, it was considered that any house of note required three principal reception rooms when entertaining: one for dancing, one for supper and one for cards. Thus, the hall, dining room and Octagon Drawing Room would fulfil those roles.

The hall retains more of its original neoclassical decorative features than many other rooms in the house; the walls' plasterwork panels and ceiling are all original, as are the Spanish mahogany doors (these had been removed during the 1920s, but were returned to the house in 1954). Only the white marble fireplace is not original to the house, but salvaged from the now demolished Panton Hall. The furniture in the room, against the walls in 18th-century fashion, is in the style of William Kent.

The Staircase Hall is at the centre of the house and is considered to be one of Carr's "most monumental interiors." Typically of this period, the double height room is lit by a clerestory while the wide cantilevered staircase, the Great Staircase, rises in flights around three of the four walls, to a gallery. The balustrading of the staircase and landing is of gilded wrought iron adorned with medallions with classical motifs which were heavily restored in 1952. The groundfloor walls beneath the gallery are decorated with some of Carr's neoclassical plasterwork depicted in white against the eau de nil colour of the walls. Recent analysis of the paint has shown that the walls were originally a pale stone colour and the staircase balustrade was painted blue with gilded figures on the (blue) plaques.

The Great Staircase, which rises only between the first and second floors, is just one of three staircases all within metres of the other at the centre of the house. A narrow spiral stair, concealed in one of the cut off corners of the Octagon Drawing Room rises from the ground floor to the roof, while "the backstairs" is another large staircase lit by the same clerestory as the Great Staircase; this rises from the ground floor to the second floor.

The Octagon Drawing Room (7 on first floor plan) completes the short enfilade beginning at the front door. It is the principal room of the house. Unfinished by Carr, the room has an ornate gilded ceiling with recessed panels in the Italian Renaissance style, installed in 1840. Of the room's eight sides, three have windows forming a large bay, at the centre of which is a large Venetian window echoing the Palladian inspiration of the mansion. Throughout the 19th and 20th centuries this room was used to display the finest art its owners possessed. Today, hung with red felt, it contains works by Pompeo Batoni and Giambattista Pittoni. The room contains fine neoclassical furniture, including items made to designs by Robert Adam, and curtains originally made for the state rooms of Blenheim Palace.

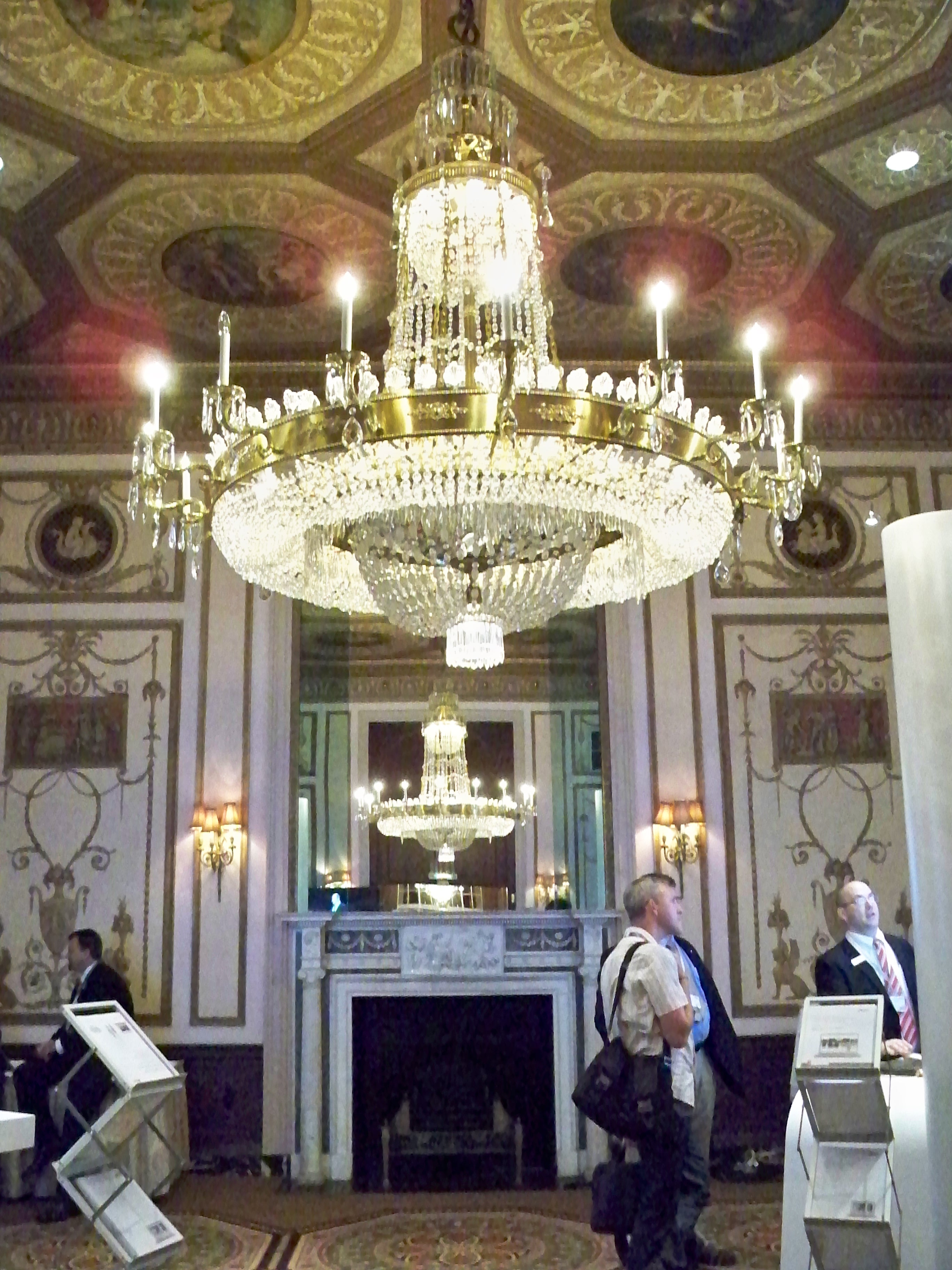
The Basildon Room, The Waldorf Astoria Hotel, New York. The room contains the original fireplace, mirrors and wall and ceiling paintings from the Dining Room of Basildon Park. The ceiling and plaster "loop and bow" panel design closely resembles that of the Basildon Dining Room.

The Dining Room (marked 8 on first floor plan) is one of the rooms most frequently changed since the completion of the mansion. Yet today it closely resembles its original form. Sited on the first floor of the corps de logis, some distance from the original kitchen (on the ground floor of the North Pavilion), the Dining Room is decorated in a neoclassical style inspired by the work of Robert Adam. The ceiling is divided into geometric panels by ornate plasterwork. Each panel originally contained a painted lunette or medallion by Theodore de Bruyn, depicting a classical scene in grisaille. The walls too have plaster panels which contained medallions, matching those of the ceiling.

In 1845, the room was redecorated by the architect David Brandon, who replaced Bruyn's paintings with polychrome depictions of Dante's Divine Comedy. The walls to which Brandon added mirrors, however, retained much of their 18th-century plasterwork. In 1929, the owner, George Ferdinando, stripped the dining room of its painted panels, mirrors, fireplace and doors and sold them to a firm of architectural antique dealers, Crowther's. The Dining Room's former decorations then crossed the Atlantic. Today, they form the Basildon Room of New York's Waldorf Astoria Hotel.

In 1952, the new owners, Lord and Lady Iliffe, had the now bare room painted by the decorator John Fowler and transformed it to a drawing room. During the late 20th century, the artist Alec Cobbe was employed to redecorate the room in a style similar to the original scheme by de Bruyn. Much of Carr's "loops and bows" plasterwork had survived, and this, coupled with a fireplace and doors salvaged from Panton Hall and very similar to those which crossed the Atlantic, allowed the room to return to its original neoclassical form.

The Kitchen was originally in the North pavilion. The concept of placing kitchens in a separate block to the house (and dining room) was a practice which had begun in the 1680s to prevent kitchen smells pervading the main house. Thus, Palladio's idea of a villa flanked by pavilions (intended to house farm animals) suited this practice admirably. However, the need for symmetry meant a balancing second pavilion was required. Therefore, it was common, as at Blenheim Palace, for the kitchen to be balanced by a chapel or an orangery, or for the less spiritual, a brewery or, as at a Basildon, a laundry. This meant that at Basildon, hot food "en route" to the dining room had to cross an open courtyard in all weathers, be taken through the ground floor of the mansion up the back stairs, cross the second floor and then be laid behind a colonnaded screen in the dining room before being finally served. During the modernisations at Basildon in the 1950s, Lady Iliffe had a new and state of the art kitchen installed on the piano nobile in the former bedroom allotted to former ladies of the house (12 on first floor plan). This solved the problem of hot food. The new kitchen is now open to the public as a nostalgic 1950s set museum piece, containing kitchen appliances and food stuffs and packaging contemporary to the mid 20th century. This is shown in the same fashion as the remainder of the house.

The second floor. 1: Lady Iliffe's bedroom; 2: Shell Room; 3: Dressing Room; 4: Bamboo Bedroom; 5: Crimson Bedroom; 6, 7, 8, 9, 11 & 12: Bedrooms closed to the public; 10: Green Chintz Room; 13: Clerestory giving light to the Staircase Hall, concealed from sight by the roofline.

The Green Drawing Room is between the Octagon Drawing room and the new kitchen. It had always previously been used as a breakfast room or small dining room, less formal than the Dining Room itself. When the National Trust took over management of the house, the room was refurnished and displayed as a drawing room. The room has a moulded plaster neoclassical ceiling and is hung with green silk which was formerly curtains at Englefield House, Berkshire. The white marble fireplace in this room is one of the few original to the house.

=== The second floor ===
The second floor was designed to be of considerably less importance than the piano nobile below, which is indicated externally by the smaller windows. However, unlike in a Baroque house of just a few years earlier, it was not reserved for lesser guests, children and servants, as is evident by its approach from a monumentally grand staircase.

== Basildon and its future ==
At the time of its building, the design of Basildon was already old-fashioned. From 1750s onwards large houses were being built without a rustic, and having the principal floor on the ground was becoming commonplace. Basildon, with its piano nobile, large portico denoting status, and main façade falsely elongated by fenestrated walls, was never innovative architecture, but, like many other houses, was built to bolster the status of its owner, the newly rich Sir Francis Sykes, keen for a political career.

Basildon is not one of the great houses of Britain; houses of similar style and size exist the length of the country. Neither is the mansion of great architectural importance. Its architect, described as "one of the most prolific of the 18th century" is far better known for his works elsewhere. Neither is Basildon remarkable for its contents. While it has some fine plasterwork, its contents, though high quality antiques, are not of the finest museum quality and its art collection consists mostly of mediocre paintings of the 17th and 18th century Italian schools, bought for their size and suitability for the decoration of the interiors rather than for their quality.

Instead, Basildon is remarkable and notable for its survival against all odds in the 20th century. At a time when it was near ruin and its destruction seemed inevitable, it was saved. Since 1900, over 1,000 country houses, many of far greater architectural importance than Basildon, have been demolished. The destruction of many of these houses began as a trickle just prior to World War I, but became a tidal wave in 1955, when one house was demolished every five days. The destruction did not halt until 1975, by which time the Iliffe's restoration work at Basildon was almost completed.

In 1978, the Iliffes gave the house, together with its park and a large endowment for its upkeep, to the National Trust, enabling the house to provide a paying public with not only an insight to the interior of a grand house during both the 18th and 19th centuries, but also a rare view of how such houses were adapted to suit a more modern life-style during the last half of the 20th century. It was Lord and Lady Iliffe's wish that "The National Trust will protect it and its park for future generations to enjoy."

== Filming location ==
In addition to being open to the public, the house has also served as a filming set. It was used as the location for Netherfield Park in the 2005 film Pride & Prejudice, and more recently the 2016 film Pride and Prejudice and Zombies, as a location for the 2006 movie Marie-Antoinette, and as Lord and Lady Radley's house in the 2009 film Dorian Gray. As well as appeared in the movie The Gentlemen in 2019. The interiors of Basildon stood in for the Crawley family's London mansion, Grantham House, on the series Downton Abbey. The garden room and parterre were used as the location for an evening party scene in the second season of Bridgerton. Netflix series, The Crown, filmed at the grounds for seasons 5 and 6. Belgravia (2020) also shot at the estate.

== Gallery ==
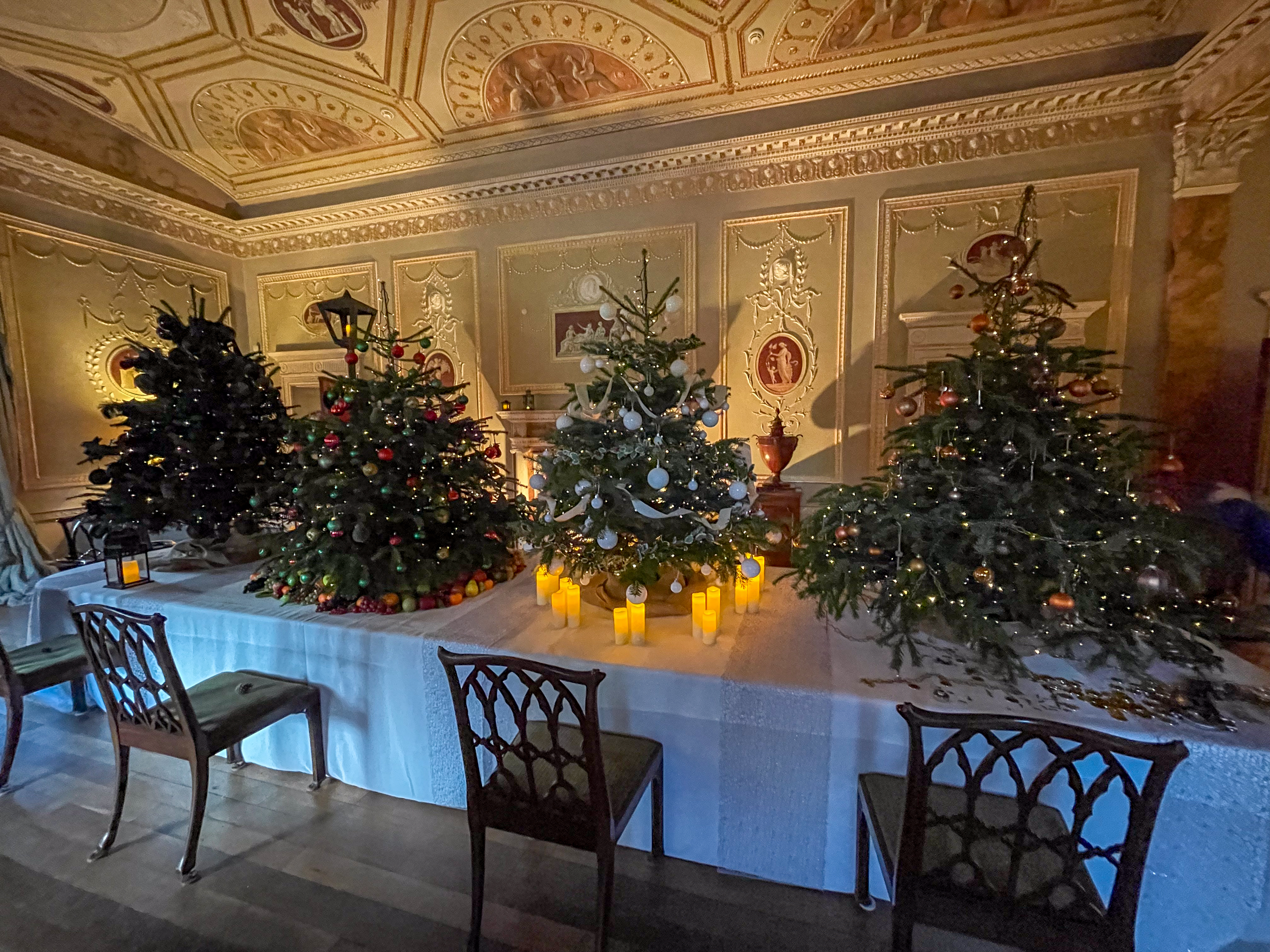
Dining Room, Basildon Park

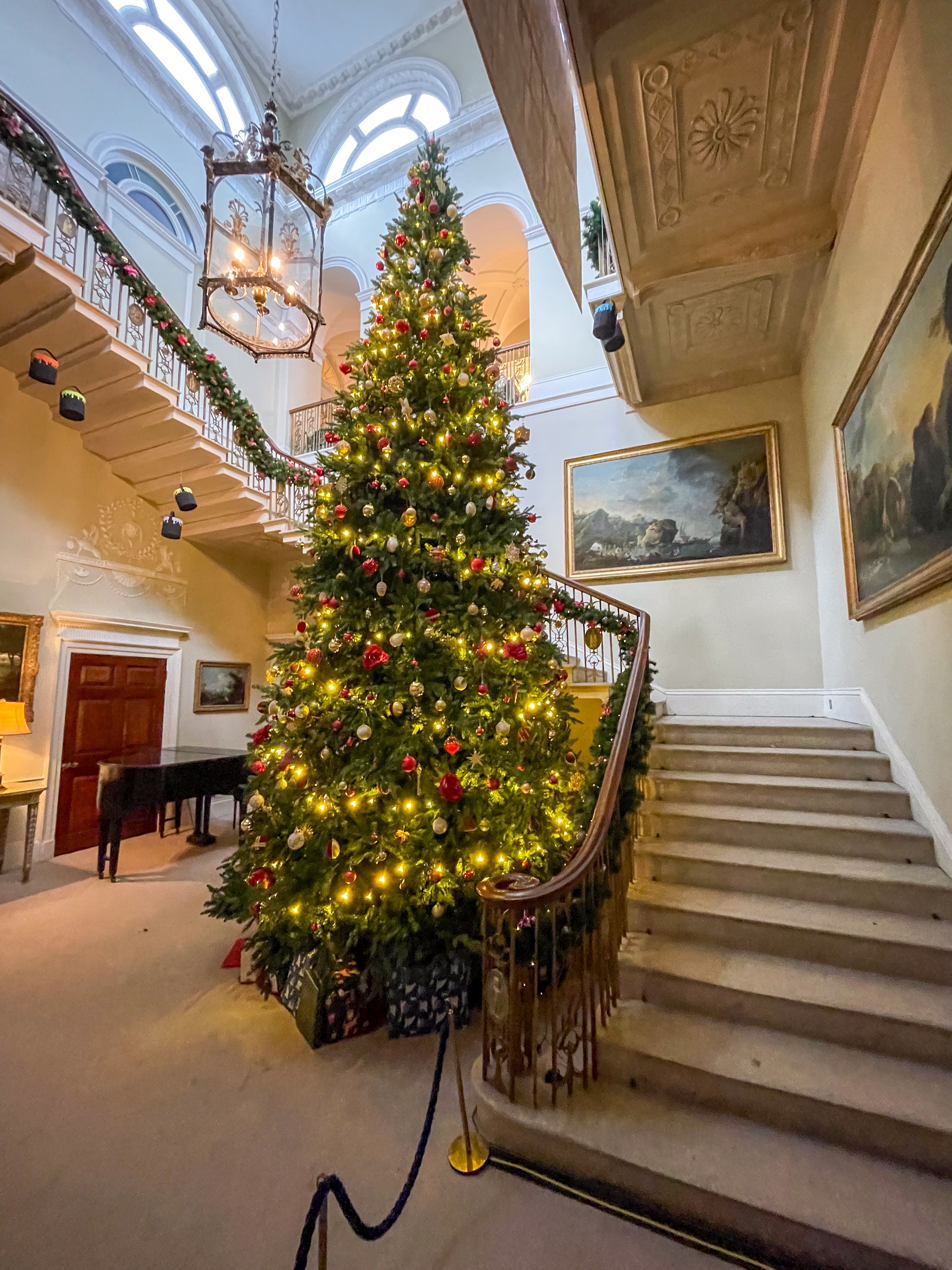
Staircase Hall

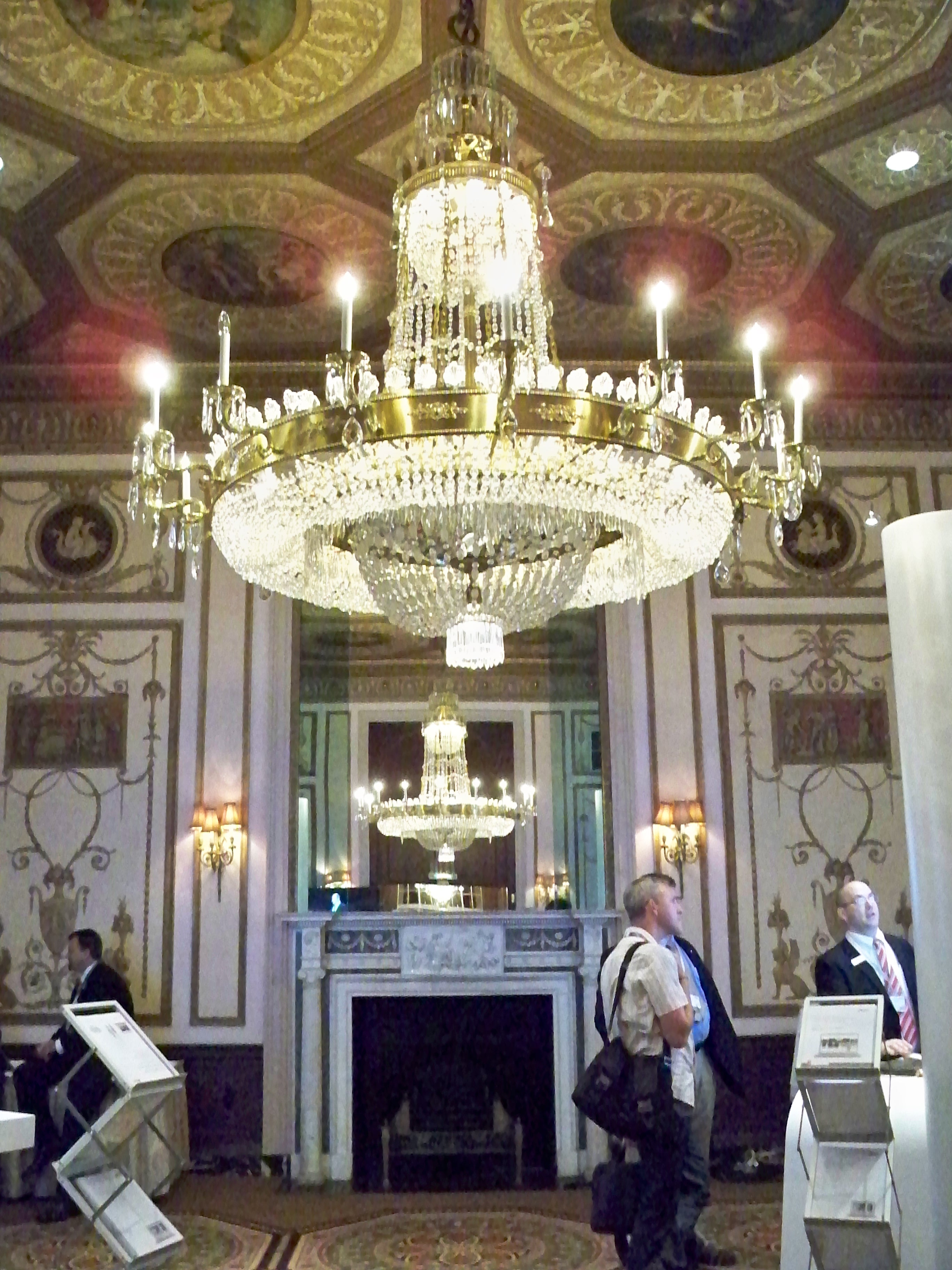
The Basildon Room, The Waldorf Astoria Hotel, New York

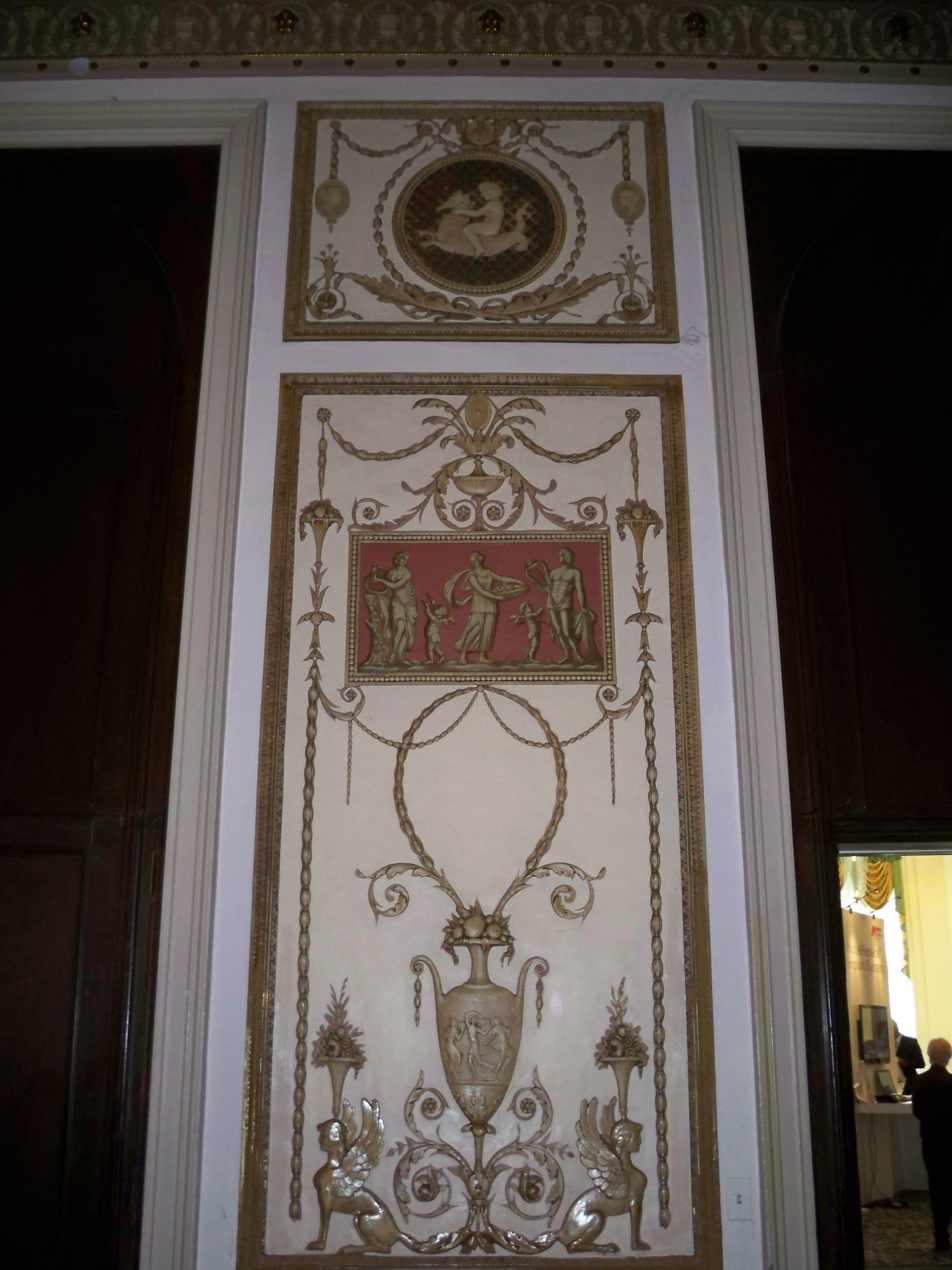
Detail from the Basildon Room.

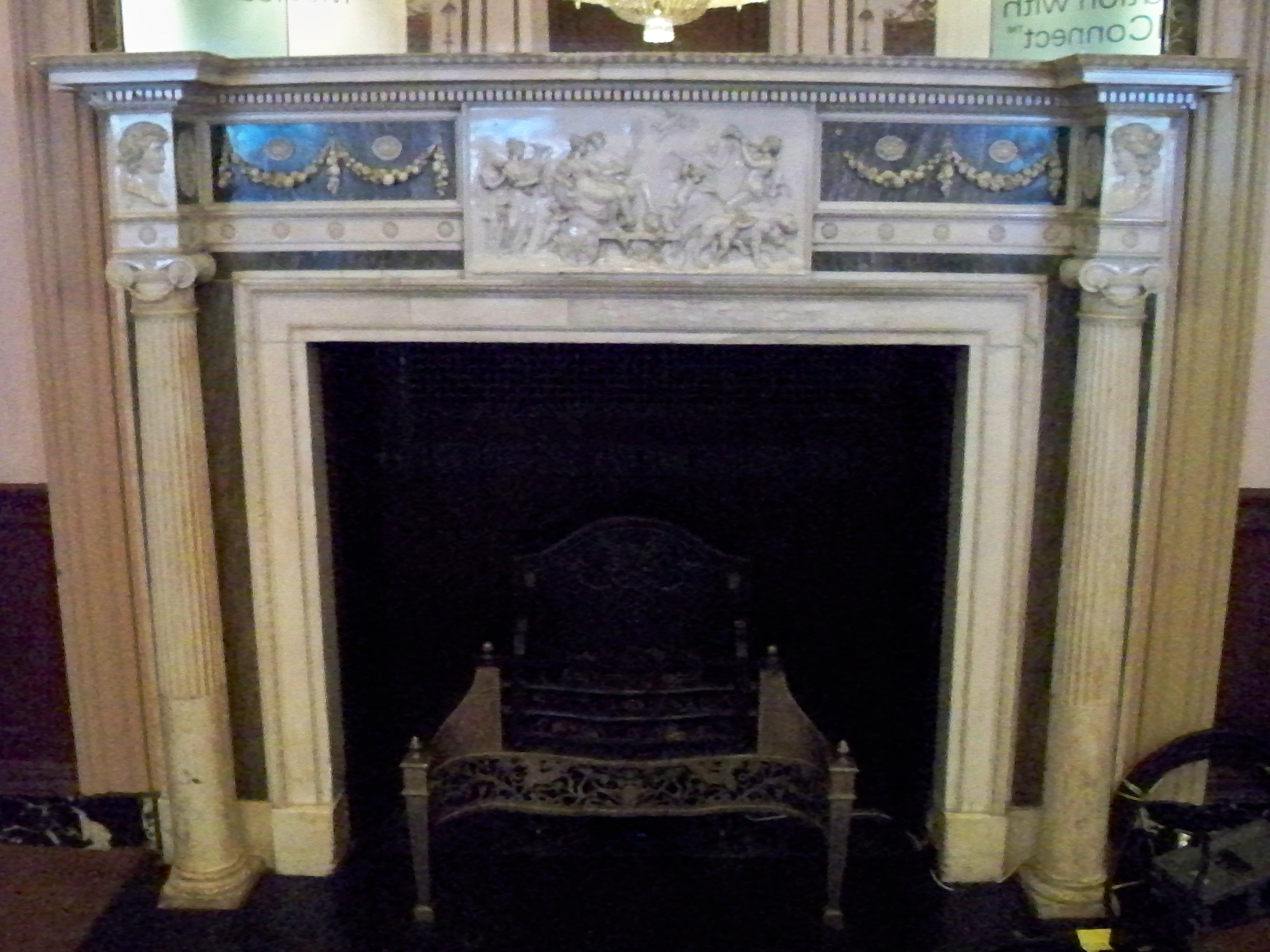
Mantelpiece of the Basildon Room.

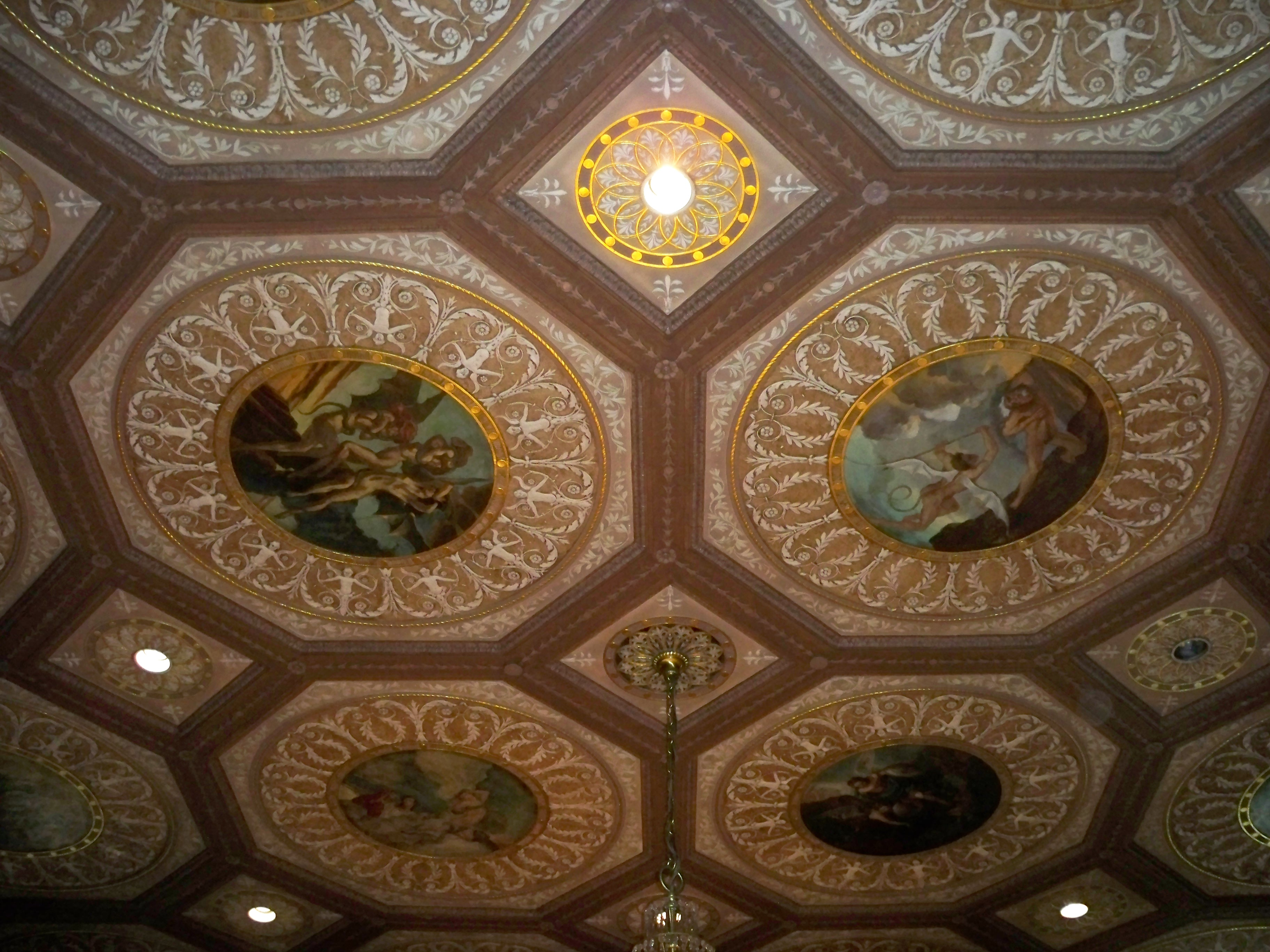
Ceiling of the Basildon Room.

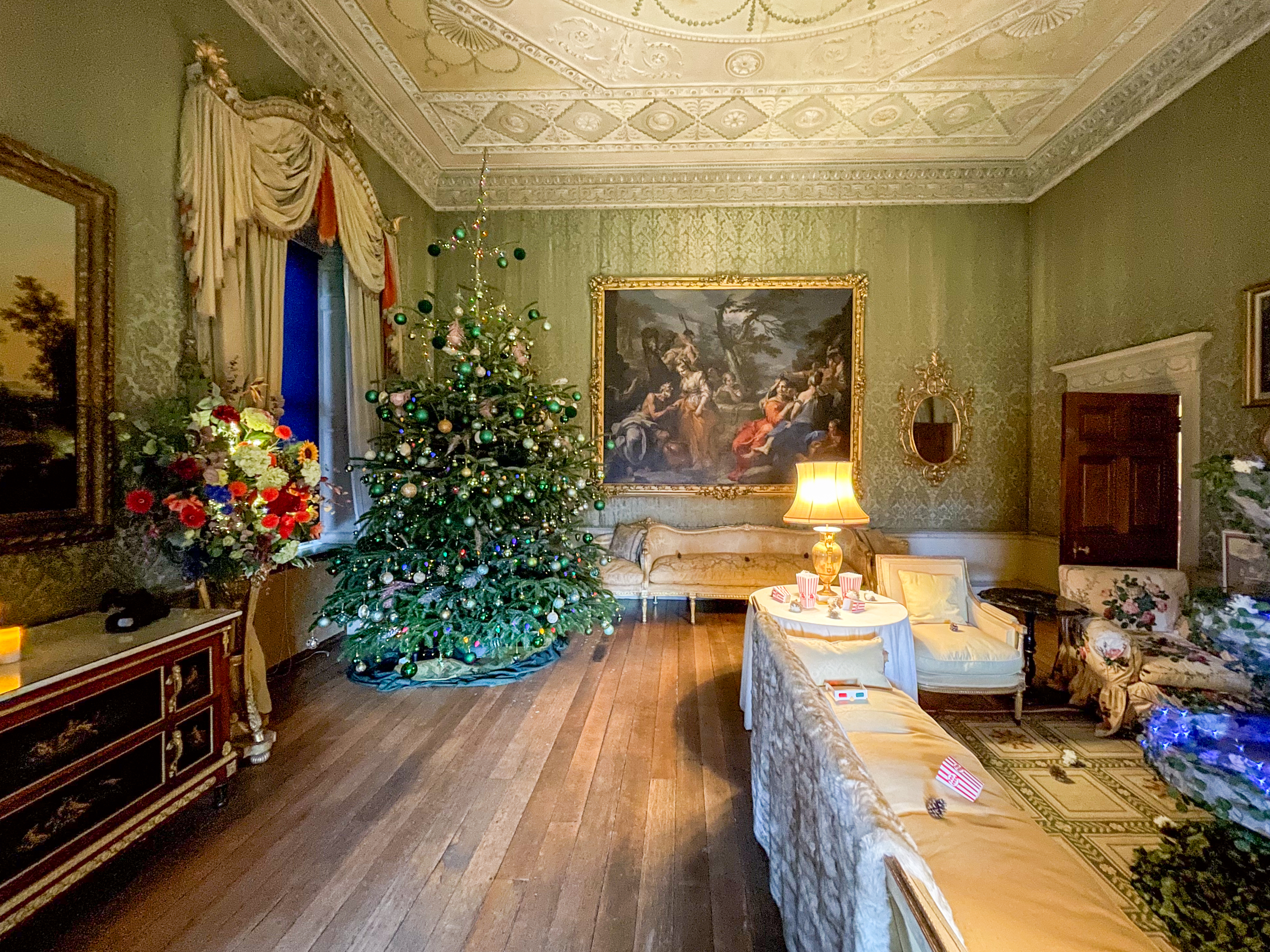
Green Drawing Room

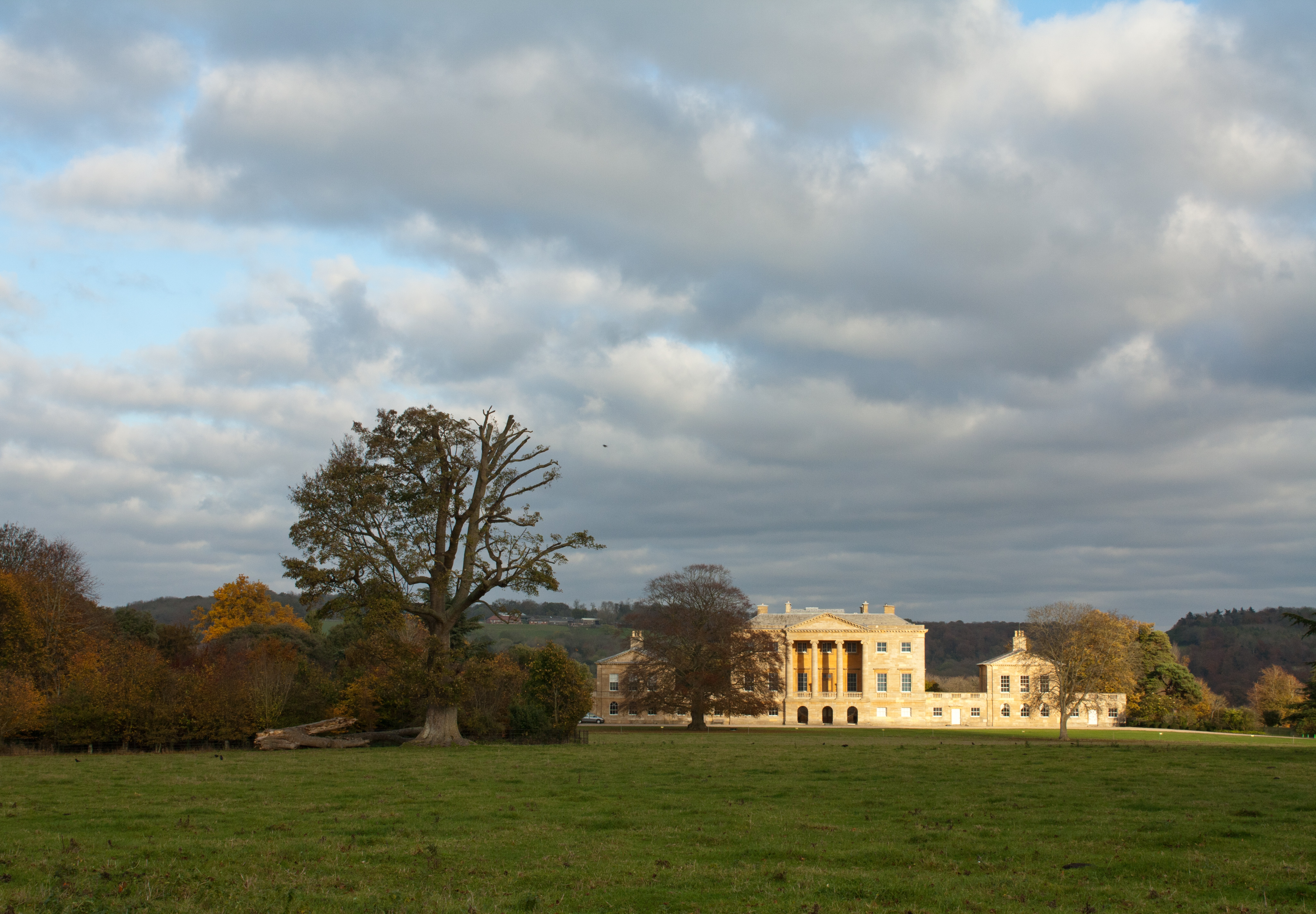
Basildon Park Landscape
