= John Iliffe =

John Iliffe may refer to:

- John Iliffe (dentist) (1846–1914), British-born Australian dentist
- John Iliffe (computer designer) (1931–2020), inventor of the Iliffe vector and pioneer of descriptor-based computer architectures
- John Iliffe (historian) (1939–2026), British professor of African history
- John Wesley Iliff (1831–1878), cattle rancher and founder of the Iliff School of Theology
