= Coventry Telegraph =

Local English tabloid newspaper

- Type: Daily newspaper
- Format: Tabloid
- Owner: Reach plc
- Editor: Adam Moss
- Founded: 1891; 134 years ago
- Political alignment: Neutral, Populist
- Headquarters: Coventry, England
- Circulation: 3,213 (as of 2023)
- ISSN: 0307-0425
- Website: coventrytelegraph.net

The Coventry Telegraph is a local English tabloid newspaper. It is published by Coventry Newspapers Limited, a subsidiary of Reach PLC Midlands Ltd, along with a number of other local publications.

== Publication history ==
It was founded as The Midland Daily Telegraph in 1891 by William Isaac Iliffe (1843–1917), and was Coventry's first daily newspaper. Sold for half a penny, it was a four-page broadsheet newspaper.

In 1917, ownership of the paper changed to Iliffe's son Edward Iliffe (later 1st Baron Iliffe), upon the father's death.

The only day the newspaper was unable to publish was 15 November 1940, owing to the blitz raid on the city.

It changed its name to the Coventry Evening Telegraph on 17 November 1941.

From 1946 until the end of April 2004, a separate sports publication, The Pink, was printed every Saturday evening. It provided coverage of sport from the Midlands, as well as national and international sport. The fortunes of Coventry City F.C. played a prominent role in The Pink. With the 1998-99 football season, The Pink became the first regional evening newspaper to provide same-day reports from all FA Premiership matches. In 2016, Coventry Telegraph launched a new weekly podcast, centred around goings on at Coventry City F.C., titled 'The Pink'.

In the 1970s, the Evening Telegraph had a regular consumer page called Watchdog, which was edited by Ken Burgess. Coincidentally, the BBC used the same name for what became its long-running Watchdog series.

In 1985, the local independent radio station (then known as Mercia Sound) and the Telegraph formed the Snowball Appeal, a charitable organisation whose aim is to raise money to help sick and needy children in Coventry and Warwickshire.

In 1987, after 96 years of ownership by the Illife family, American Ralph Ingersoll II bought the controlling interest of the Iliffe family's newspapers. However, in 1991, the managing director, Chris Oakley, led a management buy-out, creating Midland Independent Newspapers.

In 1997, the newspaper became a part of the then-Mirror Group when Midland Independent Newspapers was sold for £297 million. In 1999, Mirror Group merged with the regional newspaper group Trinity. Trinity Mirror is now known as Reach plc.

On 2 October 2006, the Telegraph simply became the Coventry Telegraph, reflecting its switch to a morning publication. The switch to a morning paper saw a change in emphasis with the printed edition concentrating on exclusive and community news, leaving breaking news to its website.

In the summer of 2014, the newspaper began a social media campaign entitled #bringCityhome, which helped ensure Coventry City F.C.'s return to the city following their exile at Sixfields in Northampton. The campaign drew praise from national media and figures within the football world. It was shortlisted at the Press Gazette British Journalism Awards 2014 in the Campaign of the Year category and Simon Gilbert, who spearheaded the campaign, was nominated for Sports Journalist of the Year.

== Headquarters ==
The headquarters for a significant period of the paper's history was at 157 Corporation Street, Coventry, CV1 1FP. The foundation stone was laid by the then proprietor, Lord Iliffe G.B.E, on 21 November 1957.

In the summer of 2012, the paper moved its headquarters to Thomas Yeoman House at Coventry Canal Basin, in Leicester Row. The decision by the proprietors was a consequence of the changing patterns of work at the paper (and the industry in general). With the number of staff reduced and no longer needing the space for the discontinued printing presses, it was decided that a smaller, more modern headquarters was now necessary. In May 2017 the Corporation Street site was opened to the public so they could view it almost as it had been left when it closed. After the exhibition ended the building was transformed into a 88-bed hotel, which opened in May 2021 and retains features of its original use.

== Editors ==
=== Current editor ===
The current editor of the Coventry Telegraph and CoventryLive is Adam Moss. He has been in post since September 2020, joining from Reach PLC Midlands, where he had taken over from former editor Graeme Brown, who left to pursue his new job as the editor of the Birmingham Live website. As well as serving as editor of Coventry Telegraph, Moss also serves as editor for Reach's main Leicestershire-based daily title, the Leicester Mercury and its digital news brand, LeicestershireLive.

=== Past editors ===
Below is an incomplete list of editors of the Coventry Telegraph and Coventry Evening Telegraph:

- Eric Ivens (1960–1973)
- Keith Whetstone (1974–1980)
- Geoffrey Elliot (1980–1990)
- Neil Benson (1991–1993)
- Dan Mason (1995–?)
- Alan Kirby (1998–2008)
- Dave Brookes (2009)
- Darren Parkin (2009–12)
- Alun Thorne (2012–14)
- Keith Perry (2015–19)
- Graeme Brown (2019–20)
- Adam Moss (2020–present)

=== Editions ===
The Telegraph is published Monday to Saturday in the following editions:

- City (Coventry Telegraph)
- Nuneaton (Nuneaton Telegraph)
- Warwickshire (Warwickshire Telegraph)

=== Sister publications ===
Current:

- The Hinckley Times
- The Loughborough Echo

Former:

- The Bedworth Echo (closed 2009)
- The Coventry Times (formerly The Coventry Citizen) (closed 2015)
- Coventry Pink (closed 2004)
- The Hinckley Herald & Journal (closed 2011)
- The Kenilworth, Warwick & Royal Leamington Spa Times (formerly The Kenilworth Citizen) (closed 2011)
- Midland Farm Ad (now closed)
- The Nuneaton Tribune (closed 2015)
- The Rugby Times (closed 2009)

== Archives ==
Historical copies of the Coventry Telegraph, dating back to 1914, are available to search and view in digitised form at the British Newspaper Archive.
