= Hinckley Times =

British tabloid

The Hinckley Times

- The front page of The Hinckley Times
- Type: Weekly newspaper
- Format: Tabloid
- Owner: Reach plc
- Founder: Thomas Baxter
- Publisher: Reach plc
- Editor: Simon Holden
- Founded: January 1889
- Political alignment: Non-partisan
- Language: English
- Headquarters: Leicester; Leicestershire
- City: Hinckley
- Country: England
- Circulation: 1,528 (as of 2024)
- Sister newspapers: Hinckley Herald (defunct); Leicester Mercury; Loughborough Echo; Nuneaton News
- Website: Leicester Mercury

The Hinckley Times is a weekly paid-for tabloid newspaper which is distributed every Wednesday and mainly serves the area of Hinckley. The paper further serves the surrounding areas in Leicestershire, including Market Bosworth, Coalville and Lutterworth.

== History ==
The Hinckley Times was founded in January 1889 by Thomas Baxter, the son of John Baxter, who was a newspaper printer and publisher in the town.

In 1922, Baxter merged the paper with a rival town publication owned by local printer Arthur Pickering, named The Hinckley Times & Guardian, Bosworth Herald & South Leicestershire Advertiser. Following the acquisition of the paper, it was renamed The Hinckley Times and Guardian, which better reflected the merger. The original name of The Hinckley Times was reinstated in 1962.

In June 1980, The Hinckley Times moved out of the Baxter family's Castle Street newspaper offices, printing, and publishing house to a new premises on Brunel Road.

On 29 February 1996, The Hinckley Times launched "one of the first ever websites" for a local newspaper.

The newspaper stopped trading as an independent publication when it was acquired in 1997 by Coventry Newspapers Limited. Following several takeovers and mergers, the owners became Trinity Mirror, which was renamed Reach plc in 2018.

The Hinckley Times stayed in Brunel Road until 2012 when the offices were demolished to make way for a new bus station as a part of The Crescent's shopping and leisure complex. The paper moved to The Atkins Building on 23 November 2012.

In October 2019, Reach announced that the offices inside The Atkins Building would close and the paper would move to the Leicester Mercury offices in Leicester by the end of the year. The closure of the offices affected two Hinckley journalists working in town, and three Loughborough Echo journalists in Loughborough who also saw their offices close at the same time.
