= Hinckley Herald & Journal =

- Type: Weekly freesheet
- Format: Tabloid
- Publisher: Coventry Newspapers
- Founded: 1985
- Political alignment: Non-partisan
- Language: English
- Ceased publication: 2011
- Headquarters: Hinckley; Leicestershire
- Country: England
- Sister newspapers: Bedworth Echo; Coventry Citizen; Hinckley Times; Nuneaton Tribune

The Hinckley Herald & Journal, best known as The Hinckley Herald and Classified Journal, was a weekly freesheet tabloid newspaper founded in 1985. It served its main target area of Hinckley and Bosworth, as well as the villages of Barwell, Burbage, and Earl Shilton in Leicestershire.

The Hinckley Herald was the town's first weekly freesheet newspaper and was launched as the sister title to the town's more well-known and recognisable title of The Hinckley Times. Both publications were owned by the same parent company of Coventry Newspapers Limited, a division of the Trinity Mirror group.

On 17 June 2007, writers at the Herald decided to go on a 24-hour organised strike and walk-out which was arranged by members of the National Union of Journalists to protest over pay with Coventry's newspaper journalists at their Trinity Mirror-owned titles.

The paper was headquartered on Station Road in Hinckley before the publication's staff members merged with The Hinckley Times staff members in their now-demolished offices which were located on Brunel Road.

The last copy of the Herald & Journal to be printed was in 2011 before it finally ceased publication.
