= Graham Brown (English cricketer) =

English cricketer

Personal information
- Full name: Graham Elliott Brown
- Born: 11 October 1966 (age 60); Balham, London, England
- Batting: Right-handed
- Role: Wicket-keeper

Domestic team information
- Years: Team
- 1986–1988: Surrey

Career statistics
| Competition | First-class |
|---|---|
| Matches | 10 |
| Runs scored | 59 |
| Batting average | 19.66 |
| 100s/50s | –/– |
| Top score | 13* |
| Balls bowled | – |
| Wickets | – |
| Bowling average | – |
| 5 wickets in innings | – |
| 10 wickets in match | – |
| Best bowling | – |
| Catches/stumpings | 19/2 |
- Source: Cricinfo, 26 August 2012

Graham Elliott Brown (born 11 October 1966) is a former English cricketer. Brown was a right-handed batsman who fielded as a wicket-keeper. He was born at Balham, London.

Brown made his first-class debut for Surrey against Kent at The Oval in the 1986 County Championship. He made nine further first-class appearances for the county, the last of which came against the Sri Lankans in 1988. In his ten first-class appearances, he scored 59 runs at an average of 19.66, with a high score of 13 not out. Behind the stumps he took 19 catches and made two stumpings. His appearances for Surrey were limited by the presence of England wicket-keeper Alec Stewart in the Surrey side, with Brown making his occasional appearances when Stewart was on international duty.
