= Loughborough Echo =

Newspaper

- Type: Weekly newspaper
- Format: Tabloid
- Owner: Reach plc
- Editor: Andy Rush
- Founded: 1891
- Language: English
- Headquarters: Princes' Court, Royal Way, Loughborough, Leicestershire
- Circulation: 1,851 (as of 2023)
- Website: LoughboroughEcho.net

The Loughborough Echo is a paid-for weekly local newspaper owned by Reach plc.

== History ==
Founded by Joseph Deakin in 1891, the Echo has had four editors in its history. It is based in the town of Loughborough, Leicestershire, England, and circulates in the town and the surrounding area. There is also a special edition, the Shepshed Echo, serving the nearby town of Shepshed. Their combined circulation from 3 July 2006 to 31 December 2006 was 21,936. For the period 29 December 2008 to 28 June 2008 the circulation figures had fallen by 15% and according to the ABC (Audit Bureau of Circulations UK) stood at an average of 18,628. This in turn fell again to 17,595 for the period 5 July 2010 - 2 January 2011.

The Loughborough Echo started life as a freesheet of four broadsheet pages and became a paid-for 18 years later, with a cover price of a halfpenny. In 1919, a man who was to play a major part in the Echo's success story, Charles Harriss, joined the paper as a reporter on being demobbed from the Army. In 1929, after the death of Joseph Deakin, he took over as editor, with Joseph's son, Arthur, as managing director. Over the years the circulation rose steadily. In 1977, Charles Harriss retired and John Rippin, who had joined the paper in 1955 as a trainee reporter, became the third editor. Within a few weeks, news replaced most of the adverts on the front page, and nearly seven years later the switch was made to tabloid. John Rippin retired in 2004 and was succeeded by Andy Rush, who remains in the editor's chair. Over the years the Echo has won a number of newspaper industry awards, and in 1997 was voted the best paid-for weekly in the whole of the Midlands and East Anglia.

== Availability ==
The Loughborough Echo can be purchased from most newsagents and supermarkets in the Loughborough and Charnwood area.
