= Birmingham Mail =

Local newspaper in Birmingham, England

- Type: Daily newspaper (Except Sundays)
- Format: Tabloid
- Owner: Reach plc
- Editor: Graeme Brown
- Founded: 1870 (as Birmingham Daily Mail)
- Language: English
- City: Birmingham
- Country: United Kingdom
- Circulation: 3,965 (as of 2024)
- Website: birminghamlive.co.uk

The Birmingham Mail (branded the Black Country Mail in the Black Country and Birmingham Live online) is a tabloid newspaper based in Birmingham, England, and distributed around Birmingham, the Black Country, and Solihull and parts of Warwickshire, Worcestershire and Staffordshire.

== Background ==
The newspaper was founded as the Birmingham Daily Mail in 1870. In April 1963 it became the Birmingham Evening Mail and Despatch after merging with the Birmingham Evening Despatch. It was titled the Birmingham Evening Mail from 1967 until October 2005. The Mail is published Monday to Saturday; the Sunday Mercury is a sister paper published on a Sunday.

The newspaper is owned by Reach plc, who also own the Daily Mirror and the Birmingham Post, the weekly business tabloid sold in the Birmingham area.

== BirminghamLive ==
In 2018, the Birmingham Mail rebranded its online presence, including its website and app, as Birmingham Live.

In 2023, BirminghamLive won in the communities and campaigning categories of the Regional Press Awards.

In 2024, BirminghamLive became the largest regional publisher in the UK, with 11 million monthly visitors.

== Editorial roles ==
The current Birmingham Mail editor is Graeme Brown, who is also editor-in-chief of the Birmingham Post, the Sunday Mercury, and their sister website BirminghamLive.

== Former editors and journalists ==
- Marc Reeves and another previous editor of the newspaper was David Brookes, who held the role from 2009 until 2014
- Steve Dyson, who is now a Pundit specialising in the state of contemporary newspapers.
