= Baron Iliffe =

Title in the Peerage of the United Kingdom

Baron Iliffe, of Yattendon in the County of Berkshire, is a title in the Peerage of the United Kingdom. It was created in 1933 for the newspaper magnate Sir Edward Iliffe. For many years the family controlled newspapers in Birmingham and Coventry, including the Birmingham Post, the Birmingham Mail and the Coventry Evening Telegraph, and were also part owners of The Daily Telegraph. The first Baron also represented Tamworth in Parliament as a Conservative.

As of 2010, the title is held by his grandson, the third Baron, who succeeded his uncle in 1996. He is the current Commodore of The Royal Yacht Squadron of Cowes, Isle of Wight.

Lord Iliffe and the rest of the Iliffe family holds (2006) an estimated fortune (according to the Sunday Times Rich List) of £200m.

The family surname and the title of the barony is pronounced "EYE-liff".

== Barons Iliffe (1933) ==
- Edward Mauger Iliffe, 1st Baron Iliffe (1877–1960)
- (Edward) Langton Iliffe, 2nd Baron Iliffe (1908–1996)
- Robert Peter Richard Iliffe, 3rd Baron Iliffe (b. 1944)

The heir apparent is the present holder's son, the Hon. Edward Richard Iliffe (b. 1968).
The heir apparent's heir is his son, Henry Robert John Iliffe (b. 1999).
