= John de Salis, 9th Count de Salis-Soglio =

British diplomat, barrister and businessperson (1947–2014)

The Count de Salis
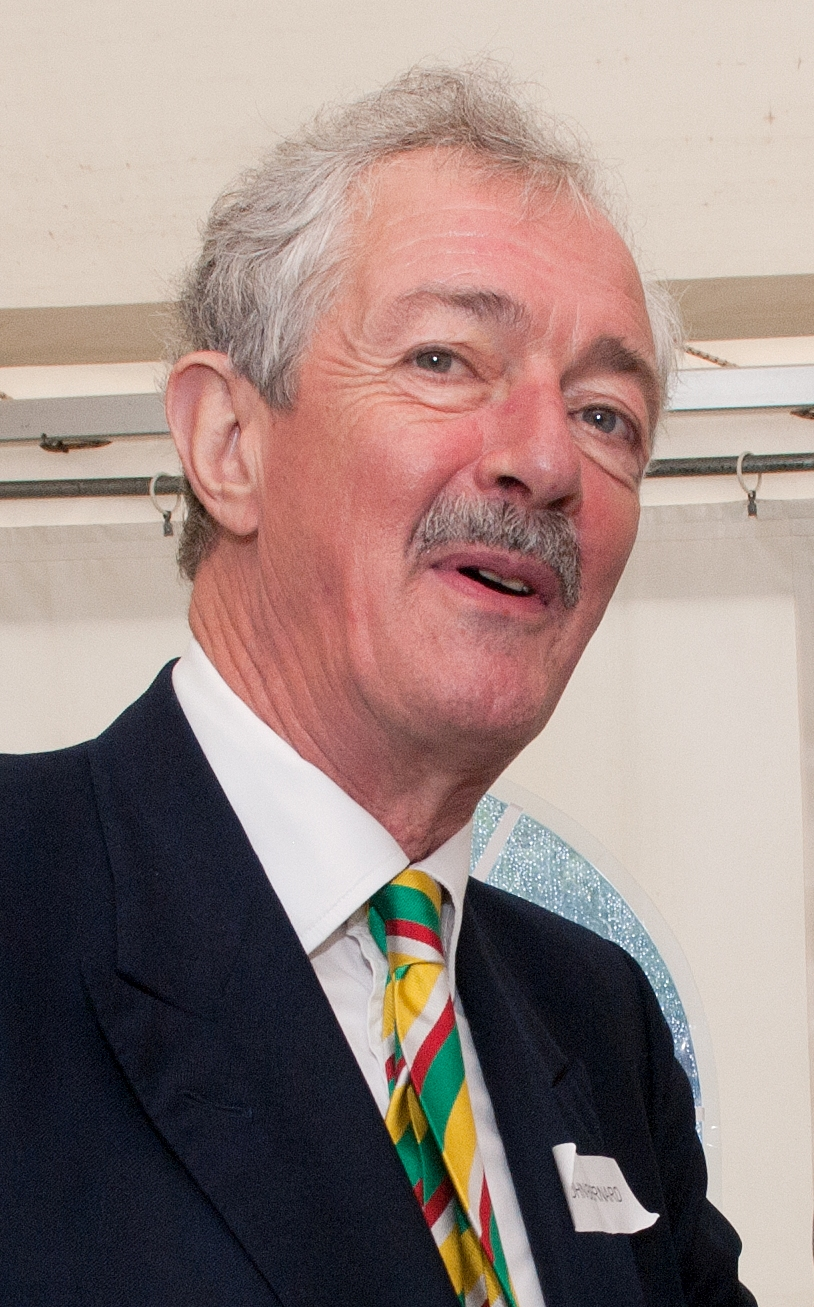
- John de Salis, photographed in southern England, July 2011.
- Preceded by: John Eugène, 8th Count de Salis
- Succeeded by: John-Maximilian Henry, 10th Count de Salis-Soglio

Personal details
- Born: 16 November 1947 London
- Died: 14 March 2014 (aged 66) Mezzane di Sotto, Veneto, Italy
- Education: Corpus Christi College, Cambridge

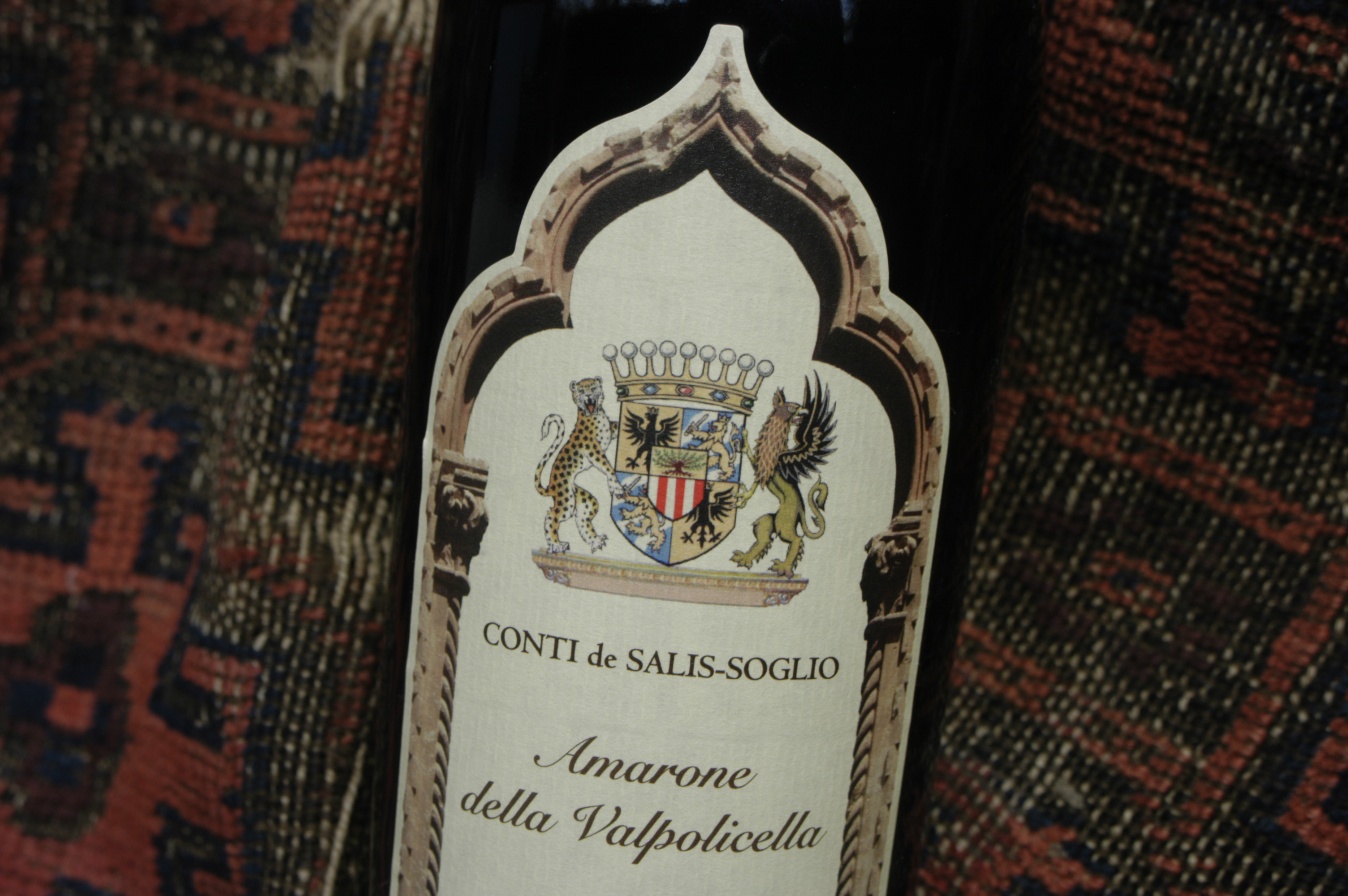
Close up on a bottle of Conti de Salis-Soglio Amarone della Valpolicella, 2007. The label features the Count's full heraldic achievement and one of the ogee arched topped windows of the facade of Verona's Palazzo Salis-Soglio.

John Bernard Philip Humbert de Salis, 9th Count de Salis-Soglio, TD (London, 16 November 1947 – Cà Buri, Mezzane di Sotto, Veneto, Italy 14 March 2014) was a Swiss-British diplomat for the Sovereign Military Order of Malta, a soldier, lawyer, and Valpolicella vigneron.

He was a member of the de Salis-Soglio noble family and was titled SRI Comes. He was a ICRC delegate and envoy; first ambassador of the Order of Malta to Thailand 1986–98, Cambodia 1993–98, president of its Swiss Association (1995–2000) and of CIOMAL (Comité International de l'Ordre de Malte), 2000–08. He was Knight Grand Cross of Honour and Devotion (2000) of the Sovereign Military Order of Malta (knight, 1974), Knight Grand Cross of the Order of Merit of the Order of Malta with Swords, and hereditary Knight of the Golden Spur.

== Life ==
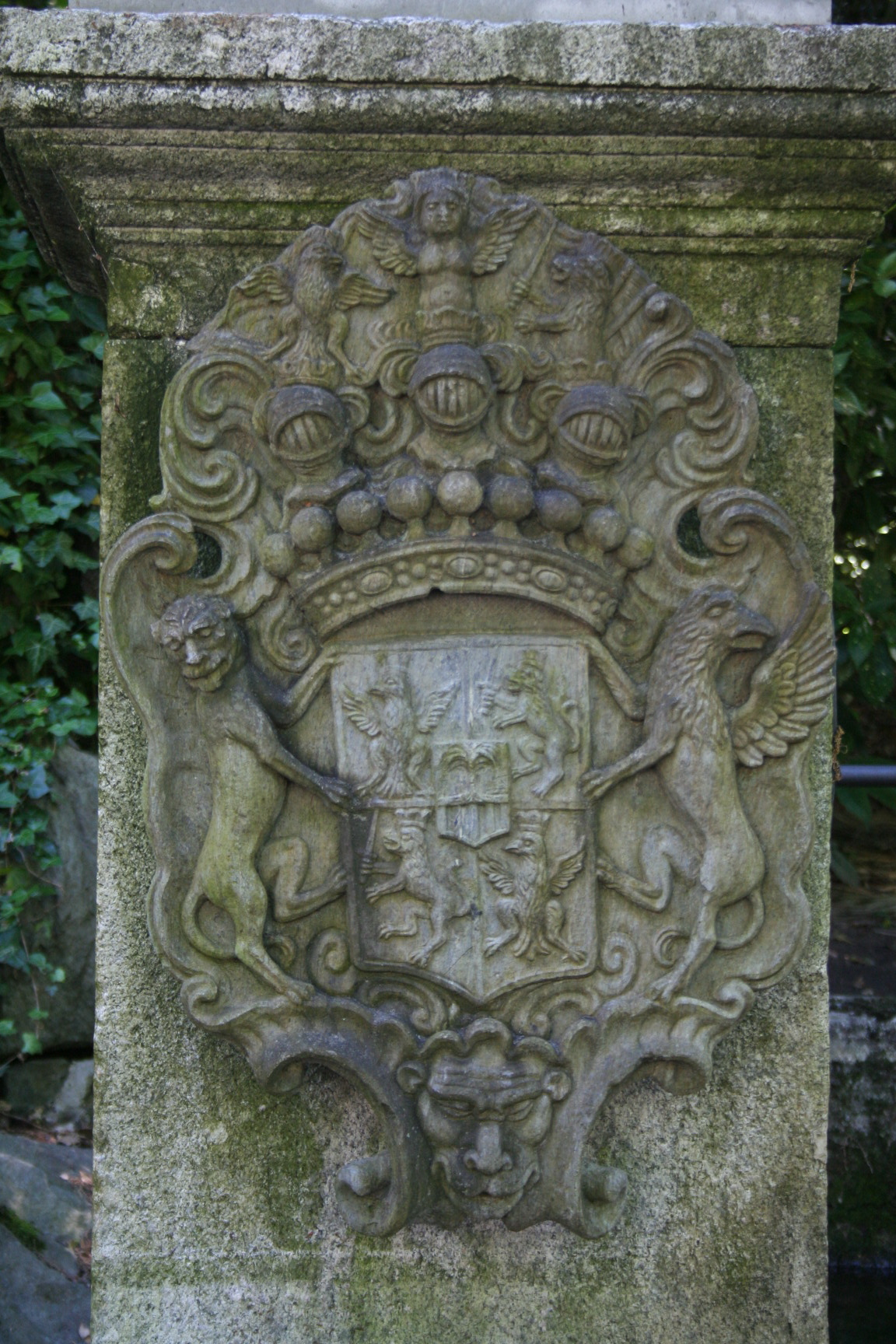
Imperial (Holy Roman Empire) arms of the Counts de Salis, as seen on the base of a now dismembered statue put up in Chiavenna in honour of Peter, 3rd Count de Salis, a popular 1770s Governor of the Valtelline. (Photo: Chiavenna, 2009).

John de Salis was a descendant of Peter de Salis-Soglio (1675–1749), of Chur and Chiavenna –created Imperial Count of the Holy Roman Empire (Reichsgraf) in March 1748 by Emperor Francis I–, and his son Jerome (naturalized British in 1731). He was the only child of Lt. Colonel John Eugène, 8th Count de Salis (1891–1949), Irish Guards, by his Italian wife Maria Camilla (1926–1953), daughter of General Umberto Presti di Camarda, of Rome, by his wife Teresa (died 1993), daughter of Filippo Nereo Vignola, of Mezzane and Verona. He was also the grandson of the British diplomat, Anglo-Irish landowner and Catholic re-convert Sir John Francis Charles, 7th Count de Salis-Soglio.

His earliest years were spent at 10 Priory Walk, Kensington, and 26 Roedean Crescent, Roehampton Gate, SW15. His father died when he was under two and his mother when he was five, his step-father when he was 10 and one of his two paternal uncles when he was four. His paternal grandparents had also died, in 1902 and 1939, so he was subsequently brought-up, inter-alia, by Franco-Belgian cousins in France (the widow and family of the 3rd Duc de Magenta at Sully, in particular), his remaining paternal uncle in Wiltshire, and his Veronese maternal grandmother, Teresa Vignola Presti di Camarda.

He was educated at Downside School, read law at Corpus Christi College, Cambridge (LLB (1972) and LLM), and was called to the Bar, Gray's Inn (1970). Later he was a tenant and then door-tenant, at 1 Brick Court, Middle Temple, EC4, and from 1972 lived at 12 First Street, SW3 and then from 1975 in two houses knocked together at 28 Upper Cheyne Row, Chelsea, SW3. Whilst in London he was also a member of the board of management of the Hospital of St John and St Elizabeth.

Alongside learning and practicing the law he served in the Cambridge University Officer Training Corps (CUOTC), the HAC (within the Territorial and Army Volunteer Reserve), then in 1972, after meeting its then Colonel, Viscount Monckton, one of whose sisters-in-law happened to be married to one of John's first cousins, transferred to the 9th/12th Royal Lancers (Prince of Wales's). He was with them in Northern Ireland and retired a (Brevet) Major in 1988, having circa 1984 been awarded the Territorial Decoration.

The combination of law of war, humanitarian instincts, soldiering and some family precedent (his father had been the Knight of Justice of the Order of St. John of Jerusalem delegate for the revision of the Geneva Convention in July 1929) lead De Salis to become the delegate of International Committee of the Red Cross Missions in the Middle East (Beirut, 1982) and Africa (Rhodesia), and head of delegation in Iraq (1980–81) and Thailand (1981–1984, Cambodian refugees), and their special envoy in Lebanon (1982). In July 1983 de Salis wrote: "It is a heartbreaking fact that ICRC being essentially concerned with the victims of armed conflicts, is more directly concerned operationally with the relief of suffering rather than its abolition."

On leaving England and moving to Switzerland he became a special officer in the Swiss Army's Panzergrenadiers, and set about a new career as a financier: as partner of Gautier Salis et Cie Geneva (1989–96), vice-chairman of Bank Lips Zurich (1996–1998), managing director of European Capital Partners (Switzerland) SA (1999–), and as director of Amadeus SA Geneva (2000–).

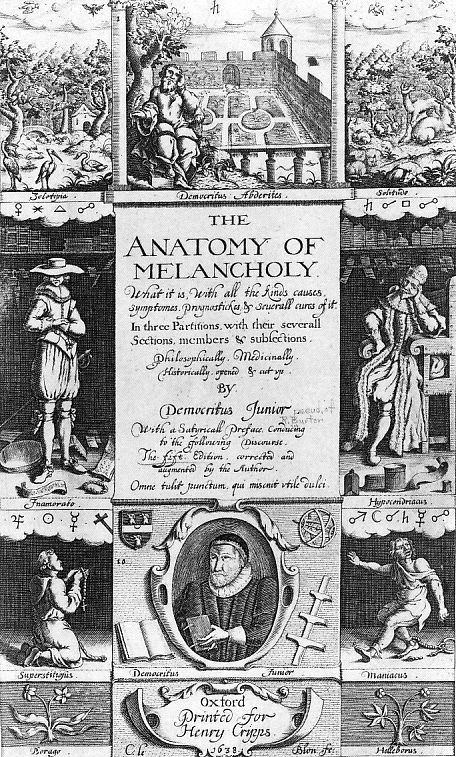
De Salis listed melancholia as his sole recreation

He took over his grandmother’s 160 acre farm in the Valle di Buri, Mezzane di Sotto and developed it from dairy to vineyard. By 2010, Conti de Salis-Soglio Wines Verona had taken shape, partly inspired by his cousin Valtelline, Conte Cesare Sertoli Salis of Tirano and Milan (1952-2005) and his Canua Sforzato, akin to Valpolicella's Amarone. John's eighteenth century ancestors, 3rd Count Peter in particular, also grew hemp and vines in eighteenth century Valtelline.

In addition to the above Count de Salis was a member of the British Association of the Sovereign Military Order of Malta; had the gold medal with Swords (Beirut) 1982; was a Knight of Justice of the Sacred Military Constantinian Order of Saint George; a Knight Grand Cross of the Order of the White Elephant (Thailand); and an hereditary Knight of the Golden Spur (Eques Auratus) (1571).

Poesie Brevi di C.V.Catullo, a book of translations of Catullus by John de Salis' great-grandfather, Filippo Nereo Vignola, done at Cà da Buri, Mezzane.

He was next male representative of Charles, second and last Viscount Fane and Baron of Loughuyre (aka Lough Gur), and of Vice-Admiral Francis William Drake, of Hillingdon, sometime governor of Newfoundland (1752–1754), younger brother of the last Drake baronet of Buckland Abbey, and thus heir-general of Admiral Sir Francis Drake himself. His only listed recreation was melancholia.

== Clubs ==
He was a member of the Cavalry and Guards Club, the Beefsteak Club, Cercle de la Terasse (Geneva), the Royal Bangkok Sports Club, and the Chelsea Arts Club.

== Family ==
He was firstly married to Samaritana Contessina di Serego della Scala (born 1950 in Verona, Italy), daughter of Dr. Cortesia Conte di Serego, on 20 January 1973. Months later their marriage was annulled and then dissolved in 1985. They had no children.

He then married (Vers l’Eglise, Vaud 1986) Marie-Claude (born in 1956 in Geneva, Switzerland), third daughter of Swiss Army Colonel René-Henri Wüst and Marie-Thérèse Bussard. The couple had three children:

- John-Maximilian Henry Fane de Salis, 10th Count de Salis-Soglio (born 1986)
- Lara Anastasia Fane de Salis (born 1995)
- Camille Charlotte Fane de Salis (born 1995)

== Sources ==
- "Obituary: John de Salis". The Daily Telegraph. 9 April 2014.
- Burke's Peerage, Foreign Noblemen / Foreign Titles sections: 1851, 1936, 1956, etc.;
- Debrett's Peerage, Foreign Titles section, 1920, 1925, etc.;
- Der Grafliche Hauser, Band XI [volume 11], Genealogisches Handbuch Des Adels, C. A. Starke Verlag, Limburg an der Lahn, 1983 (pps 331–356);
- Burke's Irish Family Records, ed. Hugh Montgomery-Massingberd, Burke's Peerage Ltd, London, 1976;

Regnal titles
Preceded by John Eugène, 8th Count de Salis-Soglio	Count de Salis-Soglio; 1949–2014	Succeeded by John-Maximilian, 10th Count de Salis
