= Rodolph de Salis =

British Army general

Lieutenant-General Rodolph de Salis CB
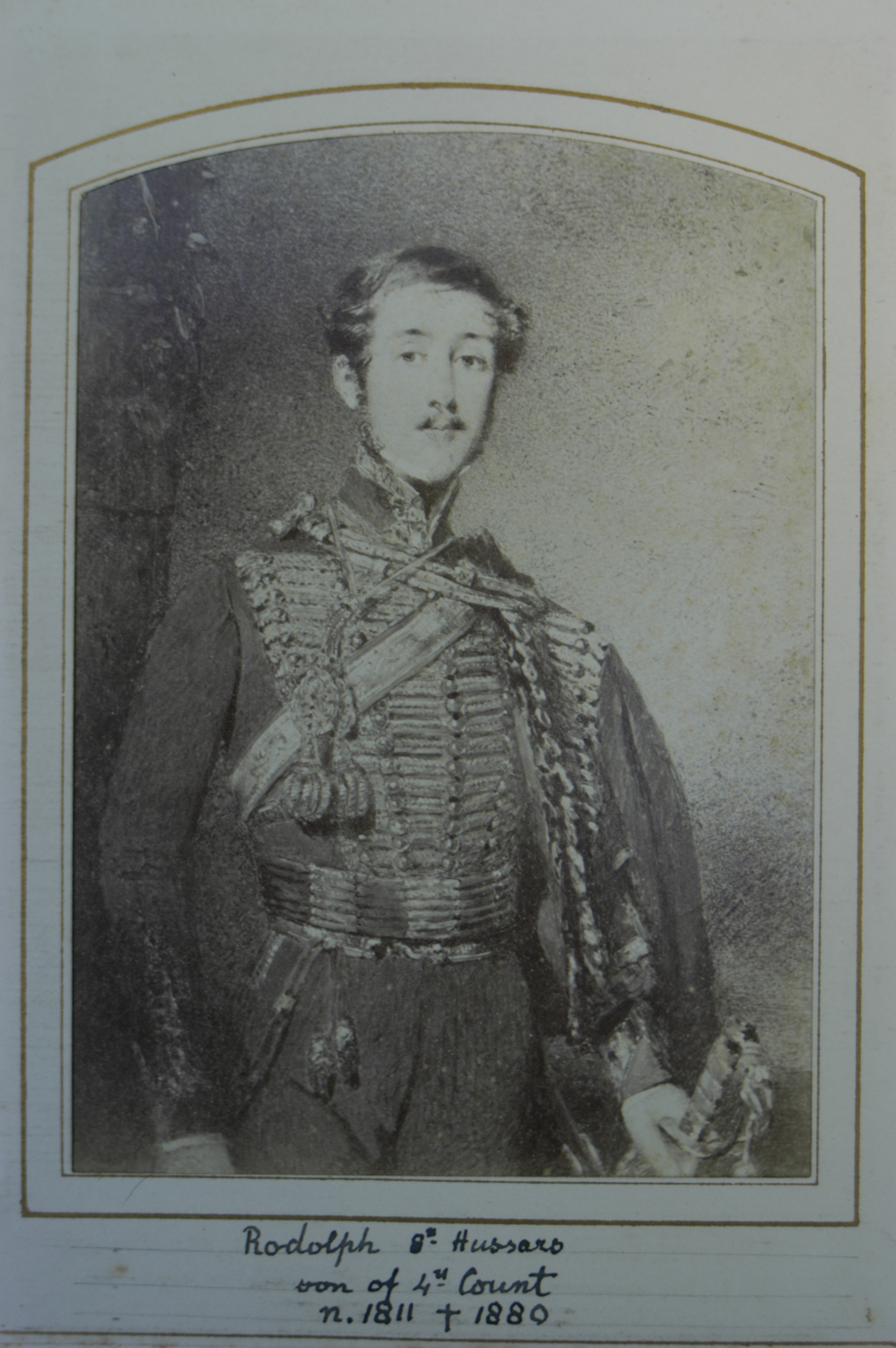
- Sketch of Lieutenant Rodolph de Salis by Sir David Wilkie
- Born: Rodolph John Leslie Hibernicus de Salis; 9 May 1811
- Died: 13 March 1880 (aged 68)

Lieutenant-General Rodolph John Leslie Hibernicus de Salis CB (9 May 1811 – 13 March 1880) was a British Army officer who fought at many major battles during the nineteenth century.

== Early life and education ==
Second son of Jerome, 4th Count de Salis-Soglio, he was educated at Eton College, Heidelberg University and Oriel College, Oxford.

== Career ==
Cornet, 17 December 1830; Lieutenant, 28 June 1833; Captain, 13 July 1838; Major, 19 February 1847; Brevet Lt. Colonel, 28 November 1854; Lt. Colonel, 2 October 1856; Colonel, 20 March 1858. He fought at Alma, Inkerman, Balaclava, Tchernaya, Kertch, Sebastopol, Central India (& Rajpootana), Kotah ki Serai, Sindwaho, Delhi, Koondrye, Chundaree, Gwalior, and Boordah.

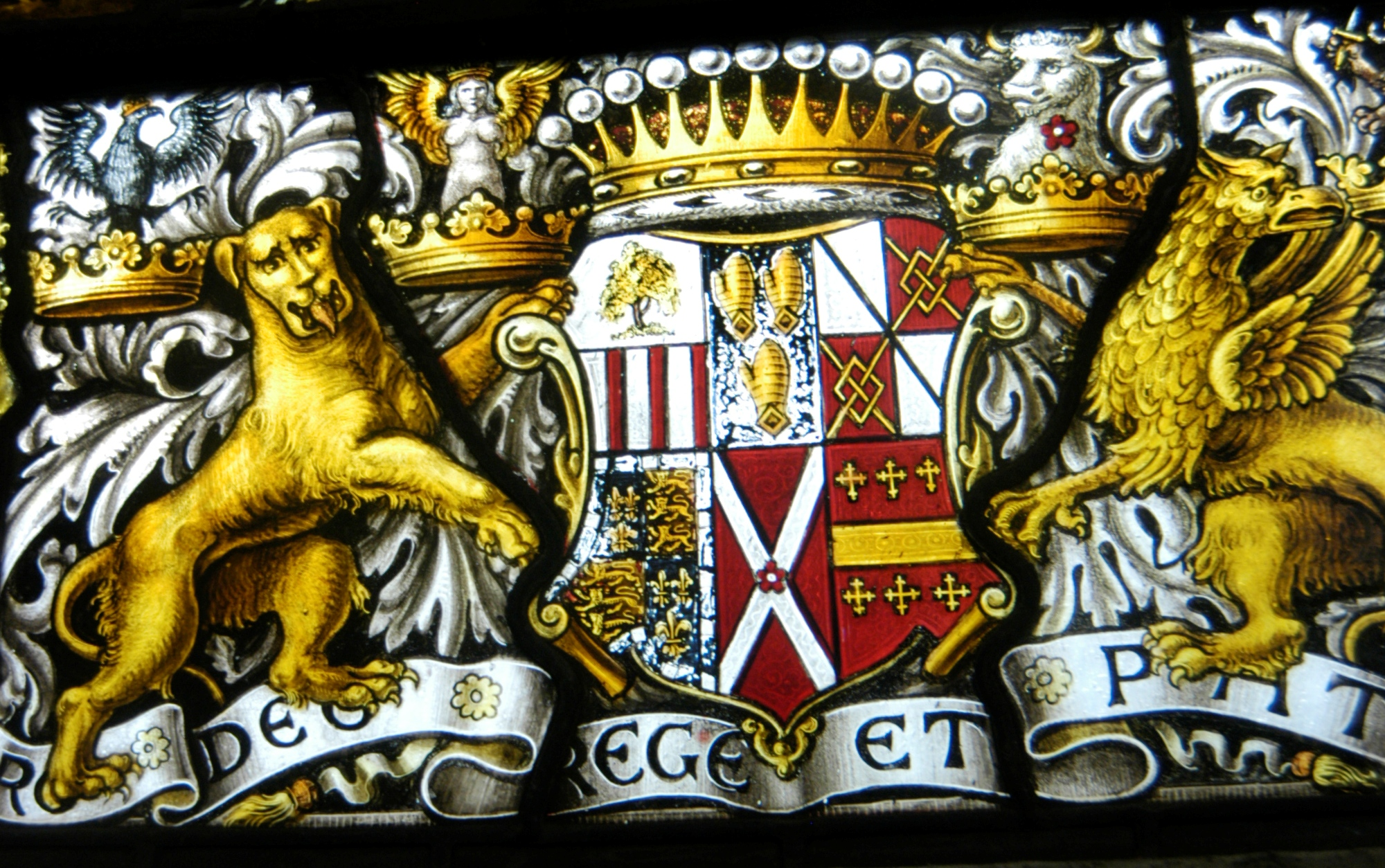
De Salis' full heraldic achievement, lowest part of an 1889 window by A. L. Moore, put up in his honour at S.S. Peter & Paul, Harlington, Middlesex. (De Salis; Fane; Le Despencer; Beaufort; Neville; and Beauchamp).

He was a recipient of the Légion d'honneur and the Order of Medjidie.

== Marriage ==
He married in Paris, 8 November 1875, Augusta Letitia Robinson, of 10 Marble Arch, London, (1839–1929), (widow of General Adolfus Derville, (1801–1874), Indian Army.

== References and Notes ==
- Forgotten Heroes: The Charge of the Light Brigade, by Roy Dutton, 2007.
