= Jerome, 4th Count de Salis-Soglio =

19th-century British noble

Jerome de Salis
- Count de Salis-Soglio
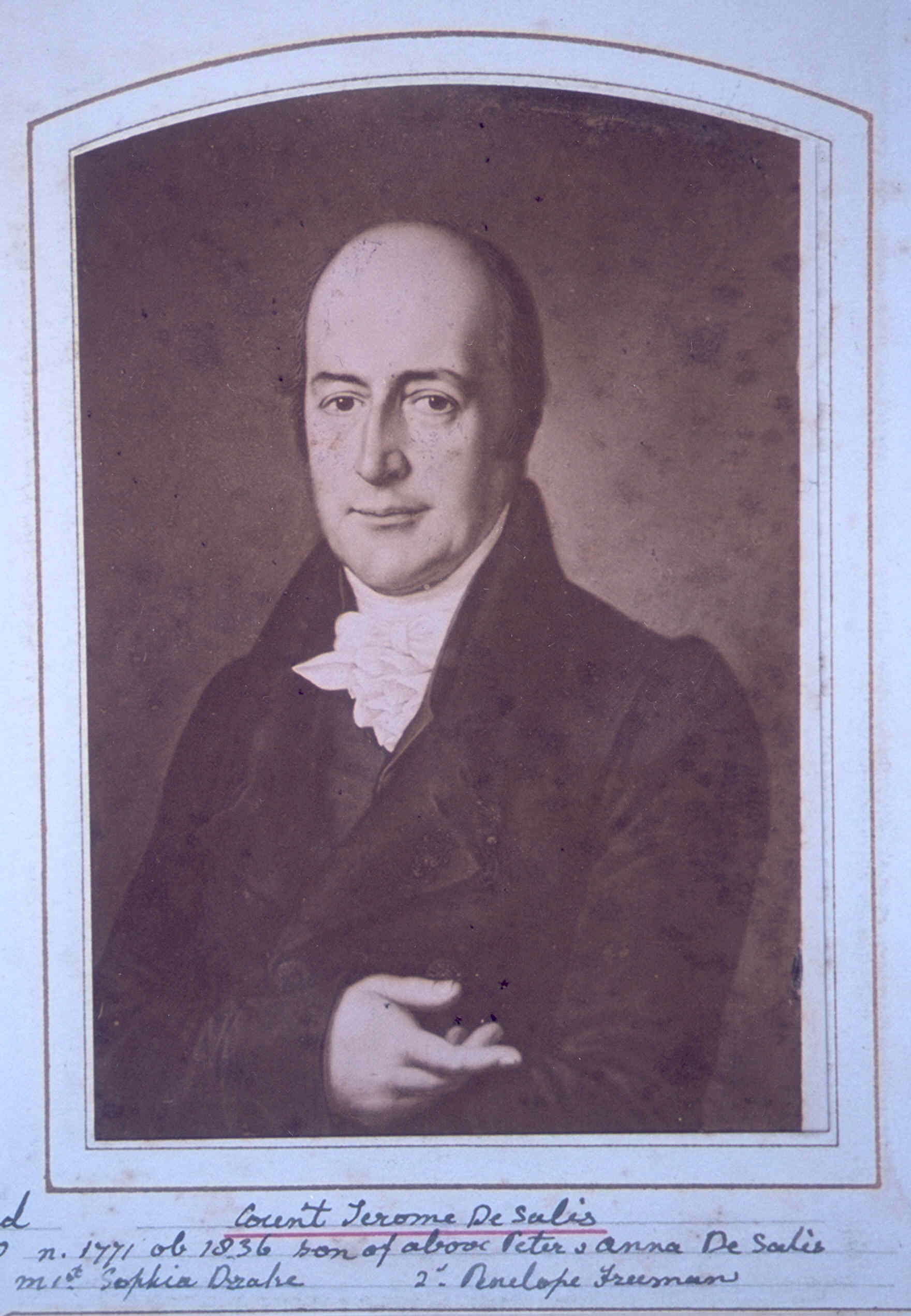
- Jerome de Salis, 4th Count de Salis-Soglio
- Born: 14 February 1771; Chiavenna
- Died: 2 October 1836 (aged 65); Dawley Lodge, Harlington, London, England
- Buried: Church of St Peter and St Paul, Harlington
- Noble family: De Salis
- Spouses: Sophia Drake (m. 1797; died 1803) Penelope Freeman (m. 1807; died 1807) Henrietta (Harriet) Foster (m. 1810)
- Issue: Peter, 5th Count de Salis-Soglio; Sophia Filgate; Rodolphus de Salis; William De Salis (Nina) Catherina Barbara Warren, Baroness de Tabley; Leopold Fane De Salis; Henrietta de Salis; John de Salis; C. Louis Fane de Salis; Henrietta Bisse-Challoner: Rev. Count Henry Jerome Augustine Fane de Salis
- Father: Peter, 3rd Count de Salis
- Mother: Ann de Salis

Jerome de Salis, Count de Salis-Soglio, DL, JP, FRS (14 February 1771 – 2 October 1836), Illustris et Magnificus, was an Anglo-Grison noble and Irish landowner.

== Life ==
Jerome, Count de Salis-Soglio, was the eldest surviving son of Peter De Salis and his third wife, Ann, daughter of Bundespresident Antonio de Salis.

Born in Chiavenna on 14 February 1771, he died on 2 October 1836 at Dawley Lodge, Harlington, and lies buried in the ancient church of St Peter and St Paul, Harlington, London, which was at the time in Middlesex.

In a letter of 1830 he proposed spending the winter in Madeira whence:

'...should the Antichrist appear next year, I can easily get a passage to Chilli... by the dream I had in 1815, or rather a waking vision during an illness I had in Dublin, the application of aerial navigation to military operations will be a sign of the coming of the Antichrist.'

De Salis was a friend of Samuel Wix, the high-churchman, and paid for his Reflections concerning the expediency of a council of the Church of England and the Church of Rome being holden, with a view to accommodate religious differences (1818) to be translated into several languages.

== Family ==
De Salis was married three times. His first marriage was to Sophia (1765 – 14 June 1803), daughter of Admiral Francis William Drake (1724–87), himself the brother of Sir Francis Henry Drake, 5th and last Baronet. The couple were married on 12 August 1797 at Shirburn Castle, and had:

- Peter John Fane de Salis, 5th Count de Salis-Soglio (St. Marylebone, February 1799 – 24 December 1870)

Four years after Sophia's death in 1803, De Salis married Penelope (died 20 December 1807), daughter of Dr. Robert Freeman, MD, of Uxbridge, on 14 March 1807 in Stoke Poges, and had one daughter. Penelope died shortly after her birth. A little over two years later, De Salis married Henrietta (Harriet) (9 October 1785 – 26 October 1856), daughter of Rt. Rev. William Foster, DD (1744–97). The couple had nine children, including Rodolphus Johannes Leslie Hibernicus de Salis, William Andreas Salicus Fane De Salis, Leopold Fane De Salis, and Henry de Salis.

== Some events ==
- Appointed Deputy Lieutenant county Middlesex 9 April 1797.
- Commissioned as a lieutenant in the Loyal Uxbridge Volunteers (Corps of Yeomanry), 5 September 1803.
- In Armagh and Limerick settling Partition of estates with Lord Sandwich, September 1805 – February 1806.
- Elected a Fellow of the Royal Society, December 1808. His proposers were:

- H J De Salis (his uncle);
- Chas Abbot (1st Lord Colchester (1757–1829);
- William Scott (Lord Stowell);
- Joseph Planta I (1744–1827, aetat suae 84), a cousin and fellow Grison. See the monumental inscription to him in St George's, Bloomsbury);
- George Pearson, MD (1751–1828);
- Selsey, (John Peachey, 2nd Lord Selsey (1749–1816)); and
- Edward Ash (c.1764–1829), MD, FCP. Physician Extraordinary to the King; editor of "The Speculator", Dublin, 1790; nephew of John Ash).

- Succeeds his father, 20 November 1807.
- Royal Licence to use title Count in the UK granted by George III, 4 April 1809.
- Appointed deputy-governor of county Armagh, 21 July 1809.
- He was appointed High Sheriff of Armagh in 1810.
- Rev. Dr. Henry Jerome de Salis, his uncle dies 2 May 1810.
- Patron of the new school at Mullavilly, Laurelvale, Ballylisk, Tandragee, county Armagh, 1811.
- Takes 21-year lease on Rokeby Hall, near Dunleer, from 29 April 1822, (550 pounds per annum).
- Royal Licence to use the name (& arms) of Fane before that of Salis, 1835.
- Ends his translation of all the extant works of St. Cyrillus of Jerusalem, 26 May 1835.
- Elected member of the Zoological Society of London, 1836 (probably).
- Recumbent figure made by Richard Cockle Lucas, for Harlington church, 1836.
- His house has five Carlton gardens, and it was sold with stables March 1845 for 12,600 pounds. The site is now occupied by BAE Systems.
- His widow lived at Dawley (near Hillingdon); the Continent; and after 1845 at Mivart's hotel and then its successor Claridge's.
- Recumbent figure made of his widow, Henrietta, by William Theed the Younger, for Harlington, 1856.

Regnal titles
Preceded by Peter, 3rd Count de Salis	Count de Salis-Soglio; 1807–1836	Succeeded by Peter John, (5th) Count de Salis
