= John Eugène, 8th Count de Salis-Soglio =

British soldier and diplomat

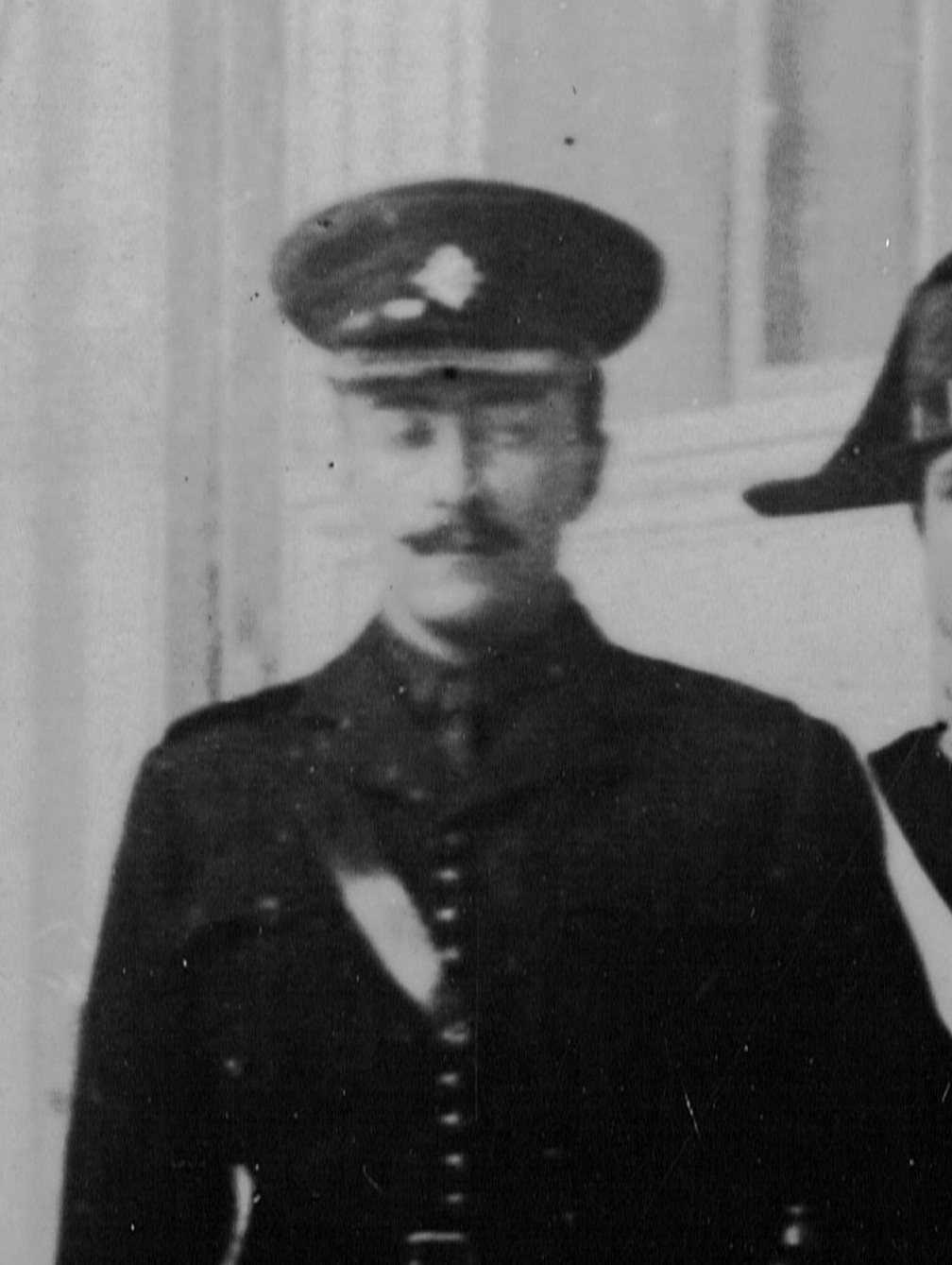
Photo of Count John Eugen de Salis, cropped from a press photograph showing the Reception of his father at the Vatican, c. 1916–1922.

Lt. Colonel John (Jean) Eugène de Salis, 8th Count de Salis, FRGS, Graf v. Salis-Soglio, (4 October 1891 – 12 June 1949), was a British soldier and diplomat.

== Early life and education ==
He was the eldest son of Sir John Francis Charles de Salis, KCMG, CVO, 7th Count de Salis, of Lough Gur House, Monasteranenagh, Kilmallock, Co. Limerick, and the Grisons, Switzerland. His mother was Hélène Marie de Riquet, Comtesse de Caraman-Chimay (18 August 1864 – 31 May 1902), eldest daughter of Marie Eugène Auguste de Riquet, Prince de Caraman-Chimay; she died aged 37, when John her eldest son was still only 10, a mere 13 days after the birth of her third son.

De Salis succeeded his father as Count de Salis-Soglio 37 years later in 1939, in the meantime he had been made and given a Bailiff Grand Cross, Order of Malta; the Order of the Crown of Roumania; a Chevalier Legion of Honour; and a Montenegrin Military Medal/Silver medal for bravery (1918).

He was educated at Jesuit Beaumont College and read modern history at Balliol College, Oxford 1910–1914, (4th class BA 1914, MA 1917). At Oxford he won the Officers' Training Corps' Company and Long Range Cups, and the Officers' Challenge Cup; was in the Snap-shooting team; won 2nd prize, Half-section Jumping, O.T.C. v Cambridge; was in the Oxford University Fencing Club (Sabres) v. Cambridge in 1913 and 1914. The 1914 varsity match was held at Tassart's Salle D'Armes, Oxford Circus, London. Tickets were 2/6.

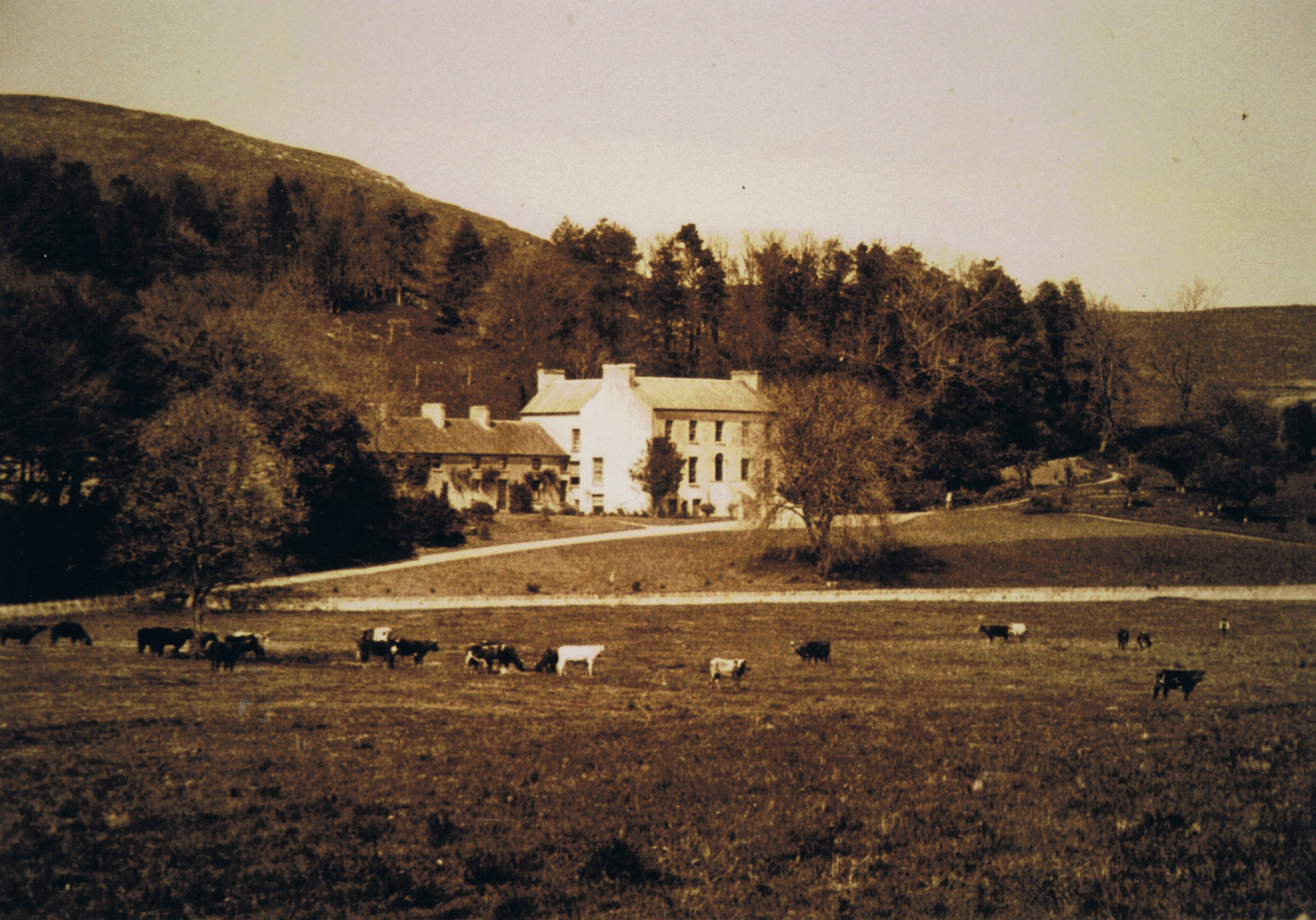
Loughgur House (formerly Grange Hill, probably built for Edward John Croker), residence in the heart of County Limerick.

== Soldier and diplomat ==
He served in World War I, the European War 1914–19, in the 1st Life Guards and Irish Guards (Lt. September 1914), and was twice wounded, 15 September 1916 and July 1917; he was Captain on special service in the Balkans. He was attached to the British Embassy in Paris, as an assistant to military attaché, 1918–19 (specially attached to Marshal Joffre); entered Diplomatic Service, 1920; appointed 3rd Secretary, Washington; transferred Tokyo, 1921–22. Aide-de-Camp to the Earl of Lytton when Governor of Bengal, 1925–27; Adjutant Indian Army Rifle Team, 1927–29; Commandant Indian Army Rifle Team, Bisley, 1930–34. Delegate of the Order of St John of Jerusalem for revision of Geneva Convention 1929. He service in the World War II as Captain on Military Mission under the War Cabinet Office in France 1939–40, here Captain Count John de Salis was drafted last minute, replacing a Captain Purvis, nominally as the Duke of Windsor's translator for his controversial trip to France in October 1939 and in co-writing his Report on Visit to the First French Army and Detachments D'Army des Ardennes. Writing in 2012 in his book The Duke of Windsor's War, Michael Bloch describing this expedition speaks of: the brilliant and subtle de Salis, as a delightful secret service diplomatist with cosmopolitan connections who, by an extraordinary coincidence, had known the Duchess (then Mrs Earl Winfield Spencer) while attached to the Washington Embassy in the early 1920s. They set off on 6 October 1939, the party comprised: five staff, Fruity Metcalfe, de Salis and the Duke.

Later in World War II he was Senior Civil Affairs Officer (SCAO) for Asmara and Hamasien, Eritrea, 1943–44; Lt. Col.; Aide-de-Camp to Field Marshal Lord Alexander, who was commander-in-chief of the British forces in the campaign for the liberation of Italy from 1943 to 1945.

== Personal life ==
He married in 1947 Maria Camilla Presti di Camarda, (23 January 1926 - Richmond 1 May 1953), daughter of General Umberto de Presti. They lived at 10 Priory Grove (now Priory Walk), South Kensington, SW10, and had one son and heir: John de Salis.
