= Henry Jerome de Salis =

English churchman

Henry Jerome de Salis, DD, FRS, FSA, (20 August 1740 – 2 May 1810) was an English churchman. He was Rector of St. Antholin in the City of London and Vicar of Wing in Buckinghamshire. He was also known as: Revd Henry Jerome de Salis, MA; the Hon. & Rev. Henry Jerome De Salis, Count of the Holy Roman Empire; Dr. de Salis; Rev. Dr. Henry Jerome de Salis, and, from 1809, Rev. Count Henry Jerome de Salis.

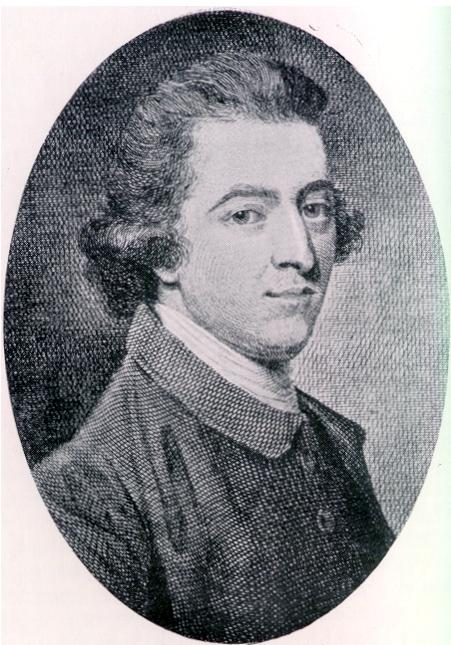
Sharp's (?) engraving

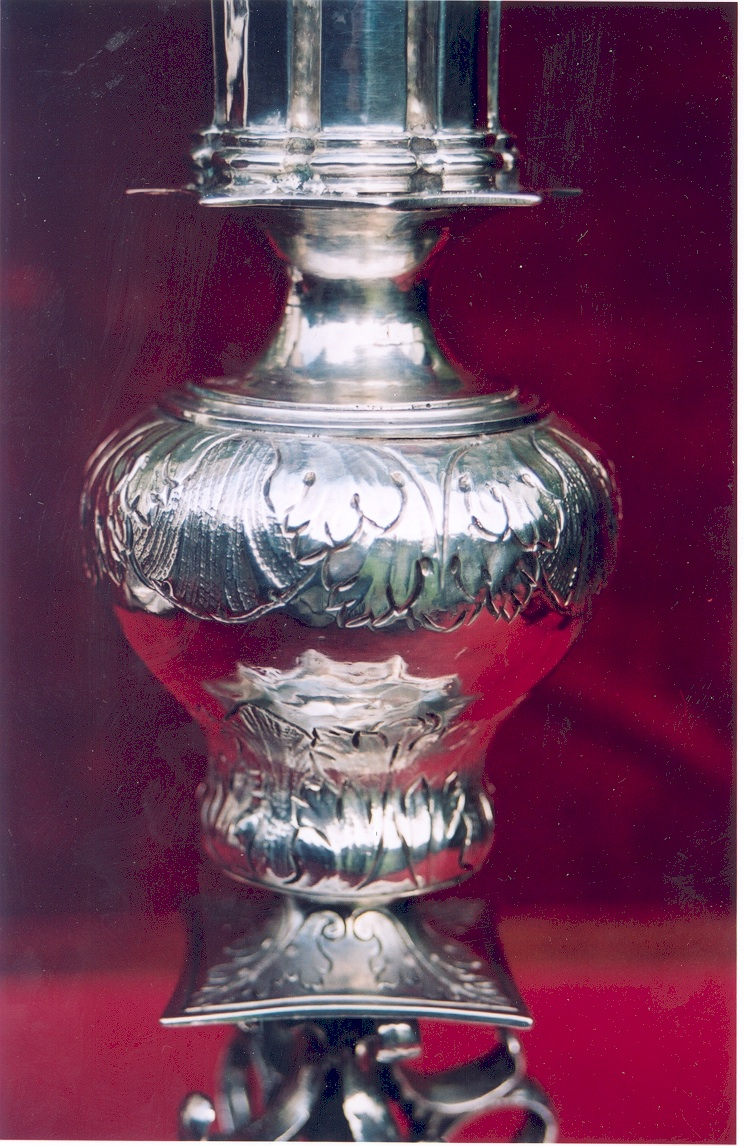
Part of an ancestral 1670s candlestick once used by De Salis

== Life ==
He was the second of four sons of Jerome (Hieronimus), Count de Salis-Soglio by the hon. Mary Fane (ffane), eldest daughter of Charles, first Viscount Fane, by his wife Mary (1686–1762) daughter of the envoy hon. Alexander Stanhope, FRS, and sister of soldier-statesman James, Earl Stanhope (1673–1721).

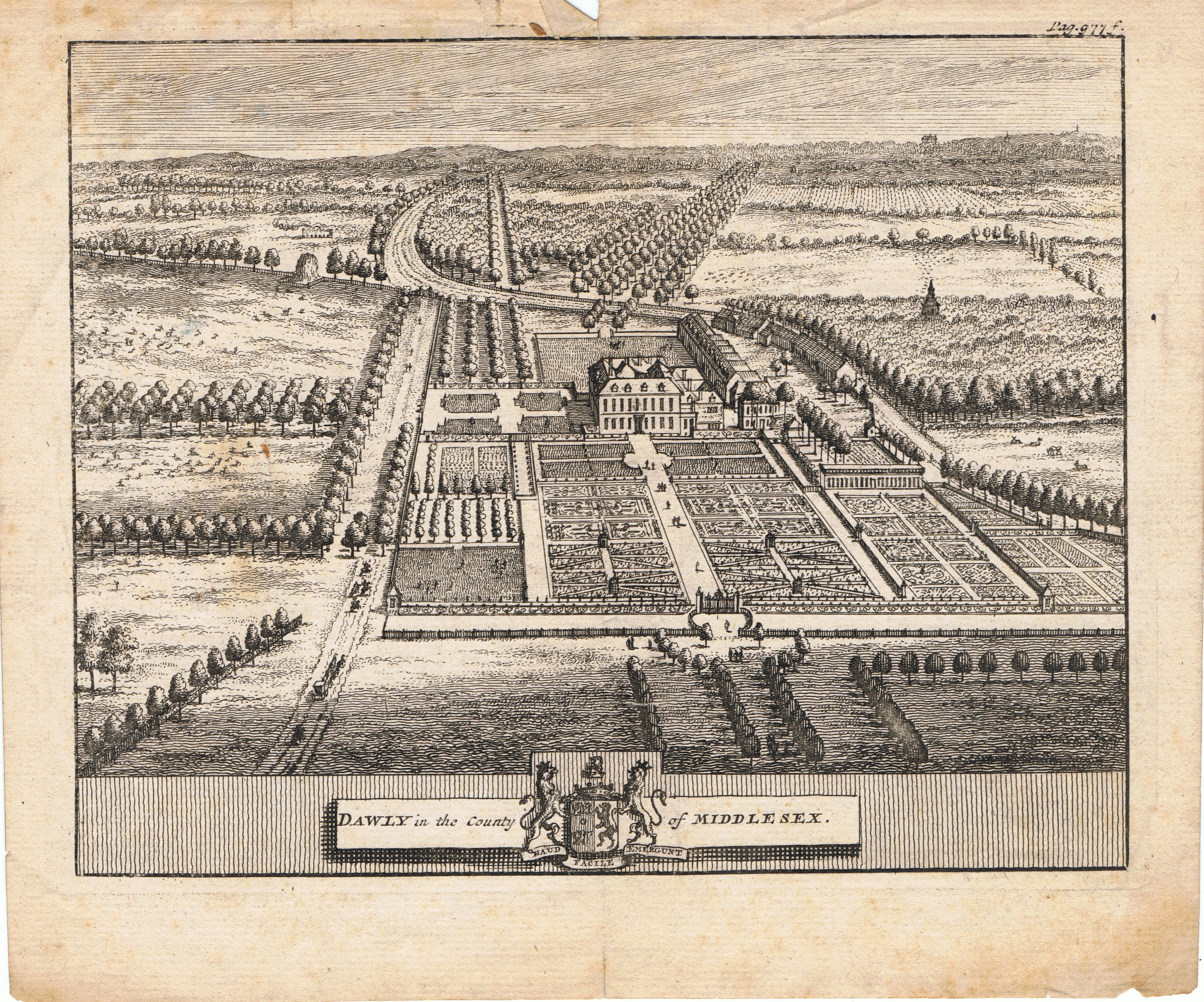
His parents (or brother Peter) bought this property in Dawley, Harlington in 1772. The mansion was soon demolished but the building on the left (east) remained until 1929

On returning from the Grisons in 1753 de Salis was sent with two of his brothers, Charles (1736–1781) and Peter (1738–1807), to Eton (he left c1757), after which he went up to Queen's College, Oxford, BA (1760), MA, DD (1777).

He was ordained into the English Church in Ireland 1760. His uncle Lord Fane appointed him Vicar of Fedamore, co. Limerick in 1760, he retained the position until 1774/5. He was appointed a Chaplain in Ordinary to George III in 1763, and was Rector of St. Antholin, Watling Street from 1774 to 1810. His kinsman the fifth Earl of Chesterfield made him Vicar of Wing in Buckinghamshire in 1777. He remained there until his death in 1810.

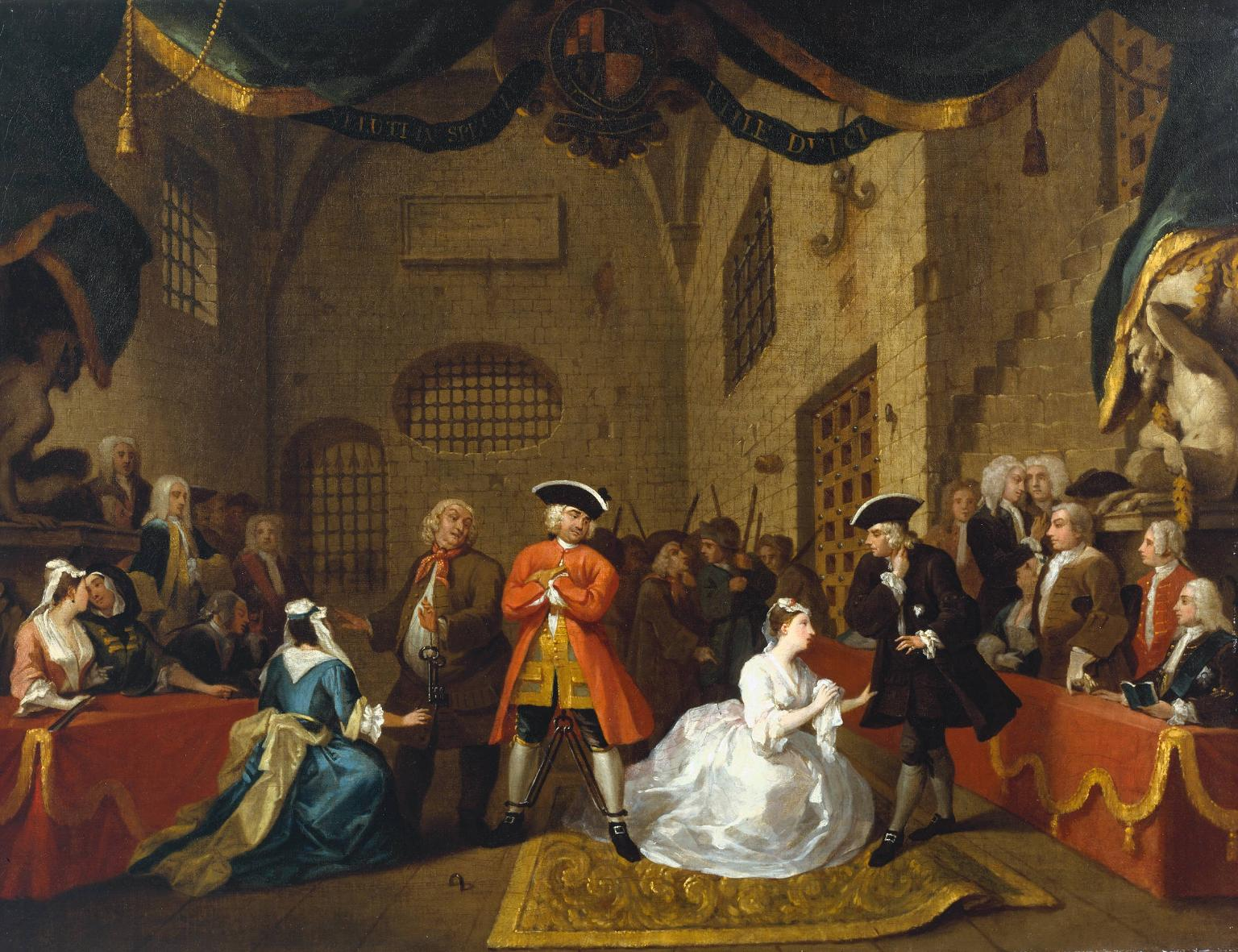
Hogarth's The Beggar's Opera VI, 1731, (22.5 x 30 inches). On De Salis' wall from 1798.

De Salis was elected a Fellow of the Royal Society (FRS) 3 May 1770. His proposers were: Lyttelton; Jeremiah Milles (c 1714 – 1784); Le Despencer; Anthony Shepherd (1721–1796); John Hunter; Robert Mylne (1734–1811); Erasmus Saunders (d. 1775); Samuel Wegg (1723–1802). He was a Justice of the Peace (JP) for Buckinghamshire and a subscriber to the Society for the Propagation of Christian Knowledge (SPCK), and the Society for the Propagation of the Gospel (SPG).

De Salis was an executor of Rev. Thomas Monkhouse, DD, FSA, Fellow of Queen's College, Oxford, who died in April 1798. From Monkhouse it seems he inherited the Tate Gallery's (since 1909) version of William Hogarth's The Beggar's Opera. However, by 1817 it had passed to Thomas Bowerbank, merchant, Factor of Lothbury, City of London (died April 1818).

De Salis's parents appointed him Game keeper of and for their said manor of Dally otherwise Dawley, near Hayes, Middlesex, from 13 June 1775.

In a letter to his father in Harley street, dated Oxford 24 September 1771 he describes 'Lord le Despencer's Festival at West-Wycombe':

Lord le Despencer's Music was incomparably performed,
and what with the excellence of that, the fine weather and
the Beauty of the place, every body went away enchanted.
On Saturday a newly erected Temple of Bacchus was opened
in the true antique Taste. The Statue of the God was crowned,
and was invoked in Verse by the High Priest Montfancon
and other Books of antiquities were consulted for proper
Ornaments, with which Mr. Dance the Painter decorated the
Bacchanalians. Our Pan and Silenus were inimitable, and
indeed every Character was well supported. There were 3 or 4000
people present, and it really was a Fête worthy of Versailles.

== Marriage ==
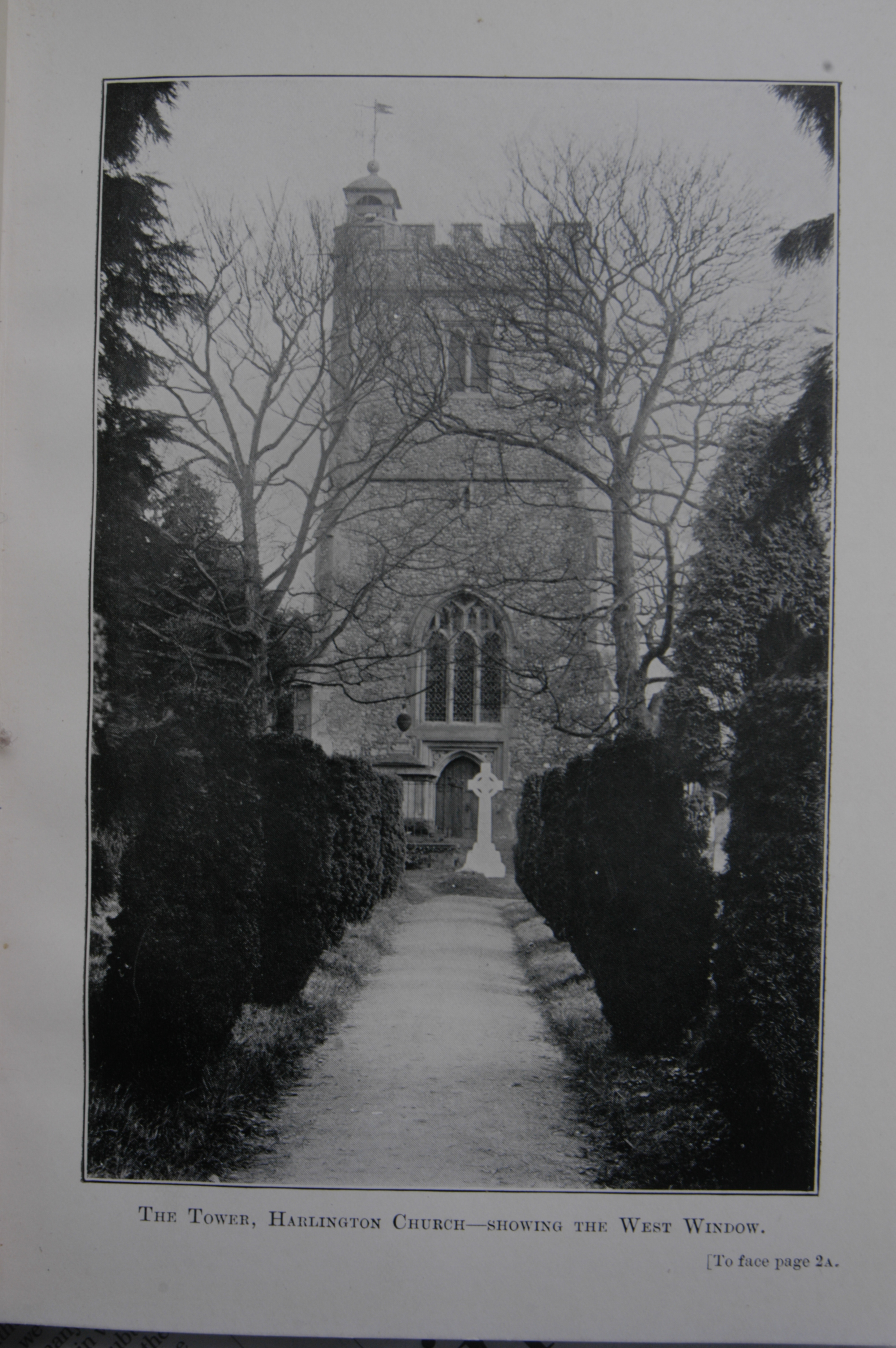
The Tower (with now lost finial surmounted De Salis tomb nearby), Harlington Church, Middlesex. photograph published 1909.

He married at St. Antholin, 17 November 1775, Miss Julia Henrietta "Harriet" Blosset from a well-connected huguenot family (d. 18 January 1819, at Hanwell), second daughter and co-heir of Solomon Stephen Blosset of Dublin & Meath (grandson of Salomon Blosset de Loche), by his wife Elizabeth Dorothy Le Coq St. Leger, from Trunkwell House at Shinfield (now Beech Hill) in Berkshire. Harriet Blosset was the girl who in 1768 had been led to believe by Sir Joseph Banks (1743–1820) that he would marry her on his return from his journey with Cook on the Endeavour. They returned in June 1771 but Banks's previous affections had been irrevocably changed by his 3 years of living with the Tahitian natives; compensation was paid.

Meanwhile, Harriet's elder sister, Bella, had married Rev. Henry Peckwell (1747–1787), clerk of St. James, Westminster, in the spring of 1773. Their daughter, Selina, was the mother of the historian George Grote.

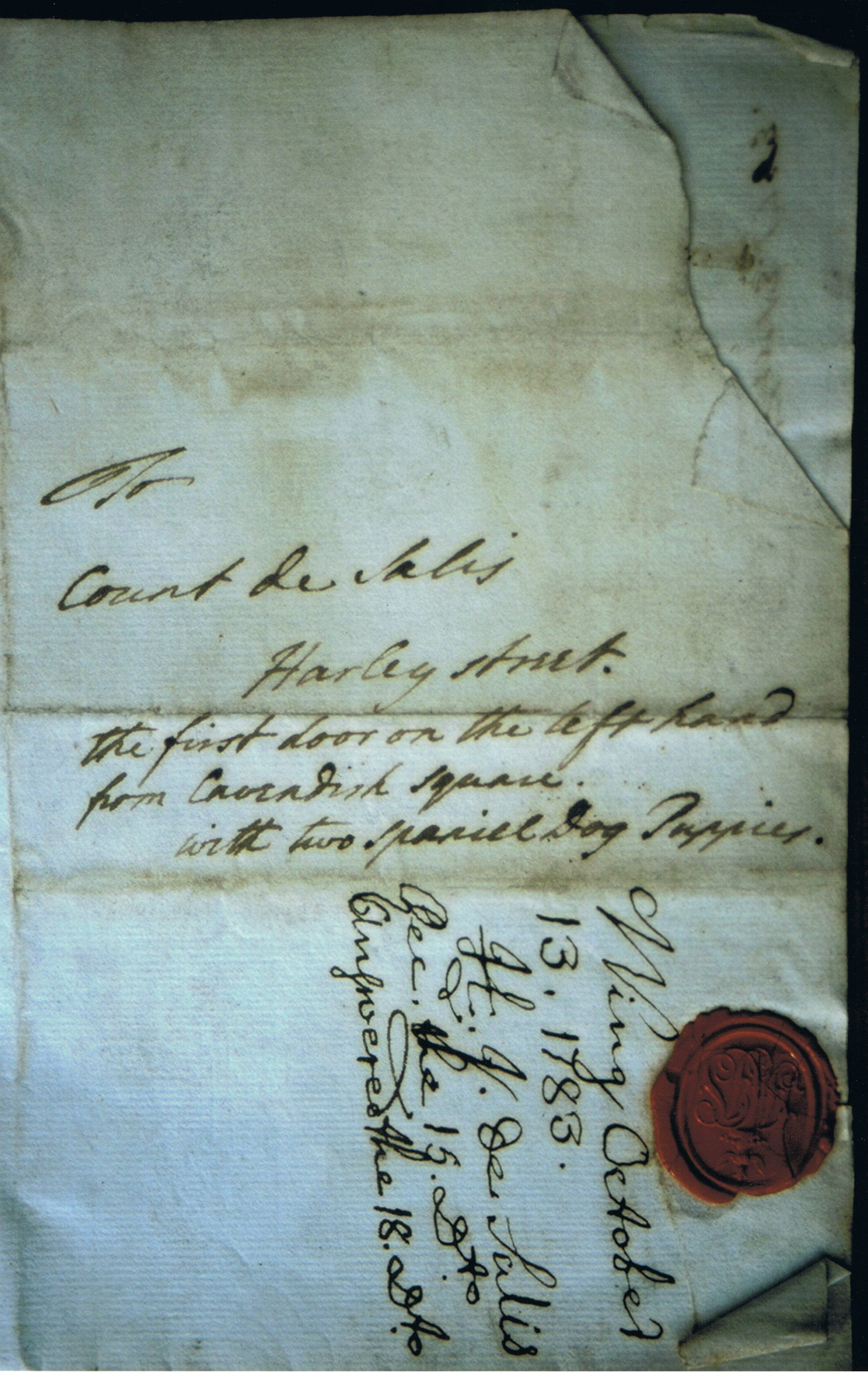
_{Outside of a letter from Henry to his father, with his father's inscriptions of receipt, 1783}

His only child, a daughter Henrietta, was born in June 1779, and died 31 March 1785, in Dover Street, Westminster. Having died on the same day as her paternal grandmother she was buried simultaneously with her in the family vault at Harlington-under-Heathrow, Middlesex, a church that is both close to Heathrow airport and clearly visible from the M4.

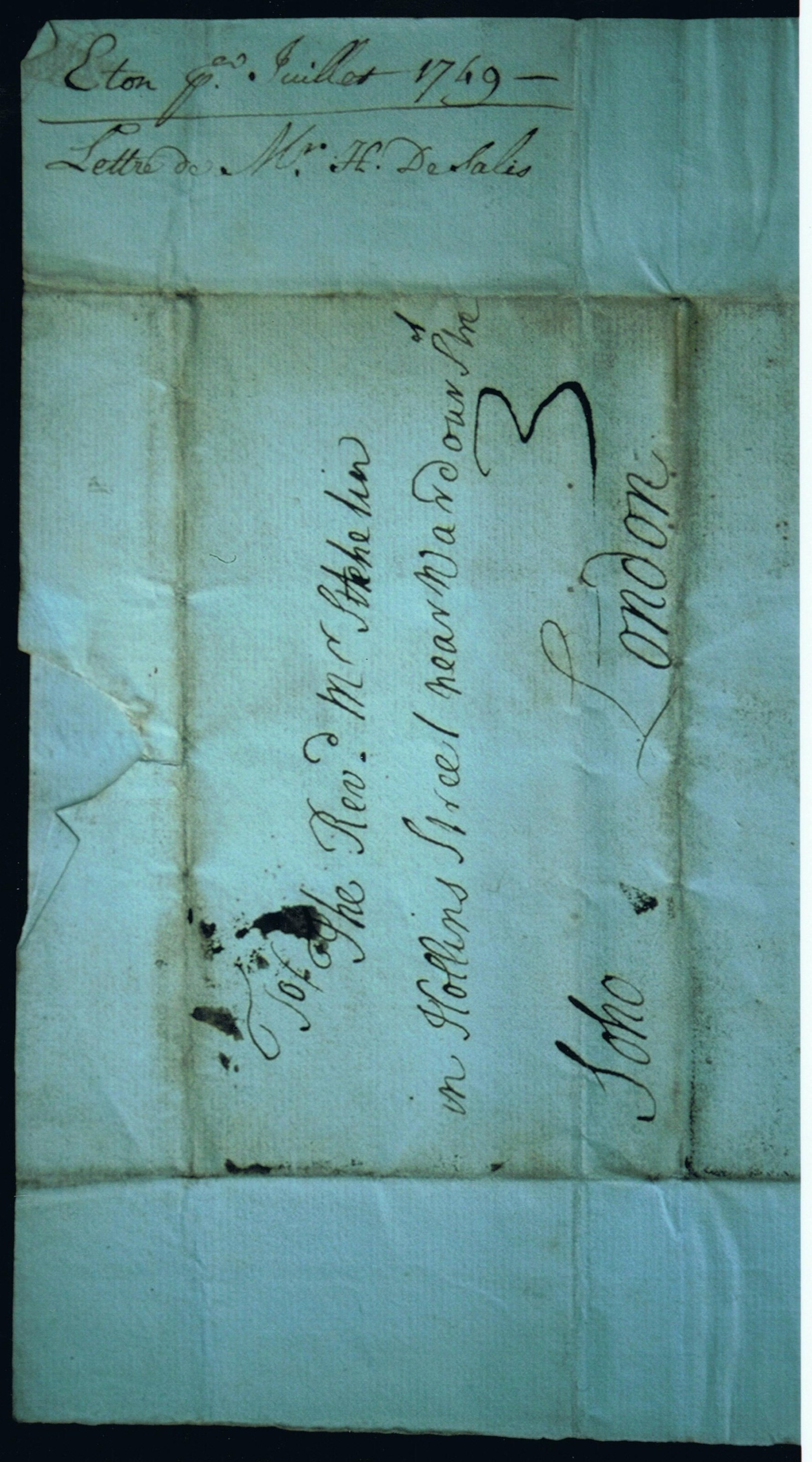
_{Letter from Henry written from Eton, 1749}

De Salis had fallen out with his elder brother Peter after their father's death in 1794, relations however were restored with his sons, the elder nephew Jerome in particular.

== Ancestors ==
Some of De Salis's ancestors
Rev. Dr. Henry Jerome de Salis	Father: Jerome, Count De Salis	Paternal Grandfather: Peter, Count de Salis-Soglio	Paternal Great-Grandfather: Antonio de Salis-Soglio
Rev. Dr. Henry Jerome de Salis	Father: Jerome, Count De Salis	Paternal Grandfather: Peter, Count de Salis-Soglio	Paternal Great-grandmother: Perpetua v. Planta-Zuoz
Rev. Dr. Henry Jerome de Salis	Father: Jerome, Count De Salis	Paternal Grandmother: Margherita v. Salis-Soglio	Paternal Great-Grandfather: Hercules v. Salis-Soglio
Rev. Dr. Henry Jerome de Salis	Father: Jerome, Count De Salis	Paternal Grandmother: Margherita v. Salis-Soglio	Paternal Great-Grandmother: Maria Magdalena v. Salis-Seewis
Rev. Dr. Henry Jerome de Salis	Mother: Hon. Mary Fane	Maternal Grandfather: Viscount Fane	Maternal Great-Grandfather: Sir Henry Fane, KB
Rev. Dr. Henry Jerome de Salis	Mother: Hon. Mary Fane	Maternal Grandfather: Viscount Fane	Maternal Great-Grandmother: Elizabeth Southcott
Rev. Dr. Henry Jerome de Salis	Mother: Hon. Mary Fane	Maternal Grandmother: Mary Stanhope	Maternal Great-grandfather: Hon. Alexander Stanhope
Rev. Dr. Henry Jerome de Salis	Mother: Hon. Mary Fane	Maternal Grandmother: Mary Stanhope	Maternal Great-Grandmother: Catherine Burghill
