= Jerome, 2nd Count de Salis =

British diplomat (1709–1794)

Jerome de Salis 2nd Count de Salis-Soglio
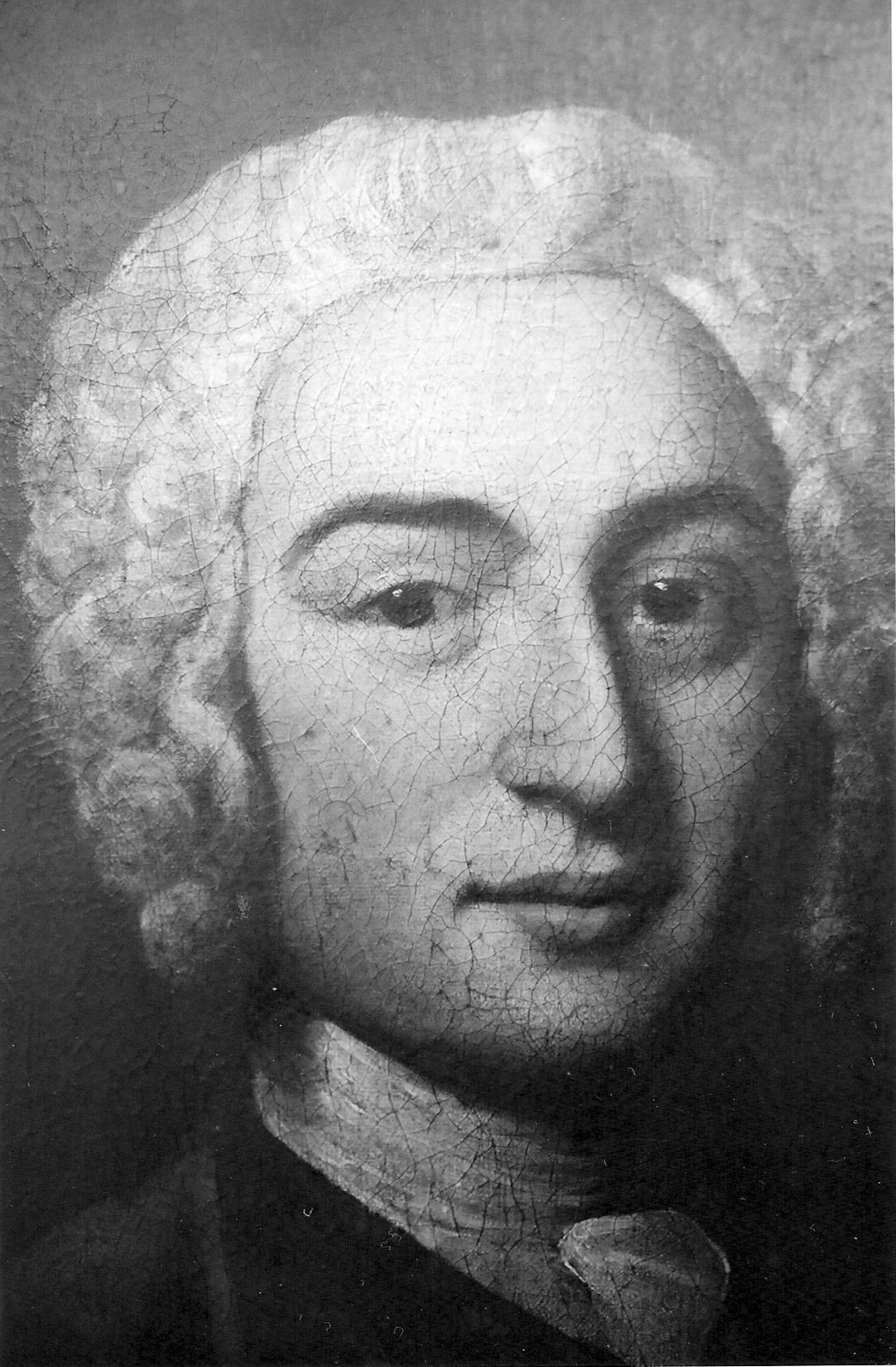
- Born: 8 July 1709
- Died: 8 August 1794 (aged 85)
- Spouse: Mary Fane
- Children: 4

Jérôme de Salis, 2nd Count de Salis-Soglio (8 July 1709 – 8 August 1794) was a Count de Salis-Soglio. He was a Fellow of the Royal Society and sometime British Resident in the Grisons. He was also known as Hieronimus, Gerolamo, Geronimo, Harry, Jerome the grandfather and Monsieur le Comte de Salis. He is the founder of the English branch of the de Salis (or Fane de Salis) family which produced a number of politicians, diplomats, officers and clerics.

== Early life ==
He was born on 8 July 1709 in Chur, capital of the Grisons, then an independent republic whose rule extended into present-day Italy, including the areas of Chiavenna and the Valtellina. He would be the only surviving son of Colonel Peter de Salis-Soglio (1675–1749), by his wife Margherita (1678–1747), daughter of Hercules de Salis-Soglio.

The de Salis family belongs to the old nobility of the Three Leagues of which they were one of the leading families between the 16th and 18th centuries. They probably descend from the patrician family Salici of Como, Italy, traceable since 1202, and firstly appear in Soglio, Switzerland with ser Rodolfus de Salice de Solio between 1285 and 1293. The Palazzo Salis in Soglio, built in 1630, is still today owned by the Swiss Salis-Soglio family branch, just as the Palazzo Salis in Bondo, Switzerland, which was built by Jerome, is still today owned by the British Salis-Soglio branch. During the Bündner Wirren (Revolt of the Leagues between 1618 and 1639) members of the von Salis family, such as Herkules von Salis-Grüsch (1566–1620) and Ulysses von Salis (1594–1674), stepped on the French-Venetian side, providing mercenary leaders who guarded the Alpine passes, and thus gained considerable influence on the country's fortunes.

De Salis's Naturalization Act 1730
- Act of Parliament
- Parliament of Great Britain
- Long title: An Act to naturalize Hieronimus De Salis Esquire.
- Citation: 4 Geo. 2. c. 5 Pr.
- Territorial extent: Great Britain

Dates
- Royal assent: 24 March 1731
- Commencement: 21 January 1731 (Note: Start of session.)

Status: Current legislation

His father, of a distinguished branch of his family, (Note: Salis's great-grandfather Antonio (1609–1682), with his brothers Rudolph and Friedrich, had bought the seigneurie d'Ober Aich and Engishofen in Thurgau on 10 June 1646. Their father was a Knight of the Order of San Marco (22 August 1603) and in turn his father had been invested an hereditary Knight of the Golden Spur on 11 April 1571 by Pope Pius V, omnibusque masculis eorum descendent in infinitum creatus. Earlier the Venetians had also made him a (life) Knight of the Order of St. Mark.) had been a soldier in France, in the Dutch Republic and in England, where he became envoy of the Grisons Republic to the Court of St. James's during the reign of Queen Anne. There he became an Anglophile and made influential friends amongst the Hanoverians. On his return to Chur he resolved to send his son to London and Jerome De Salis became a naturalised British subject by a private act of Parliament, De Salis's Naturalization Act 1730 (4 Geo. 2. c. 5 Pr.) on 24 March 1730/31.

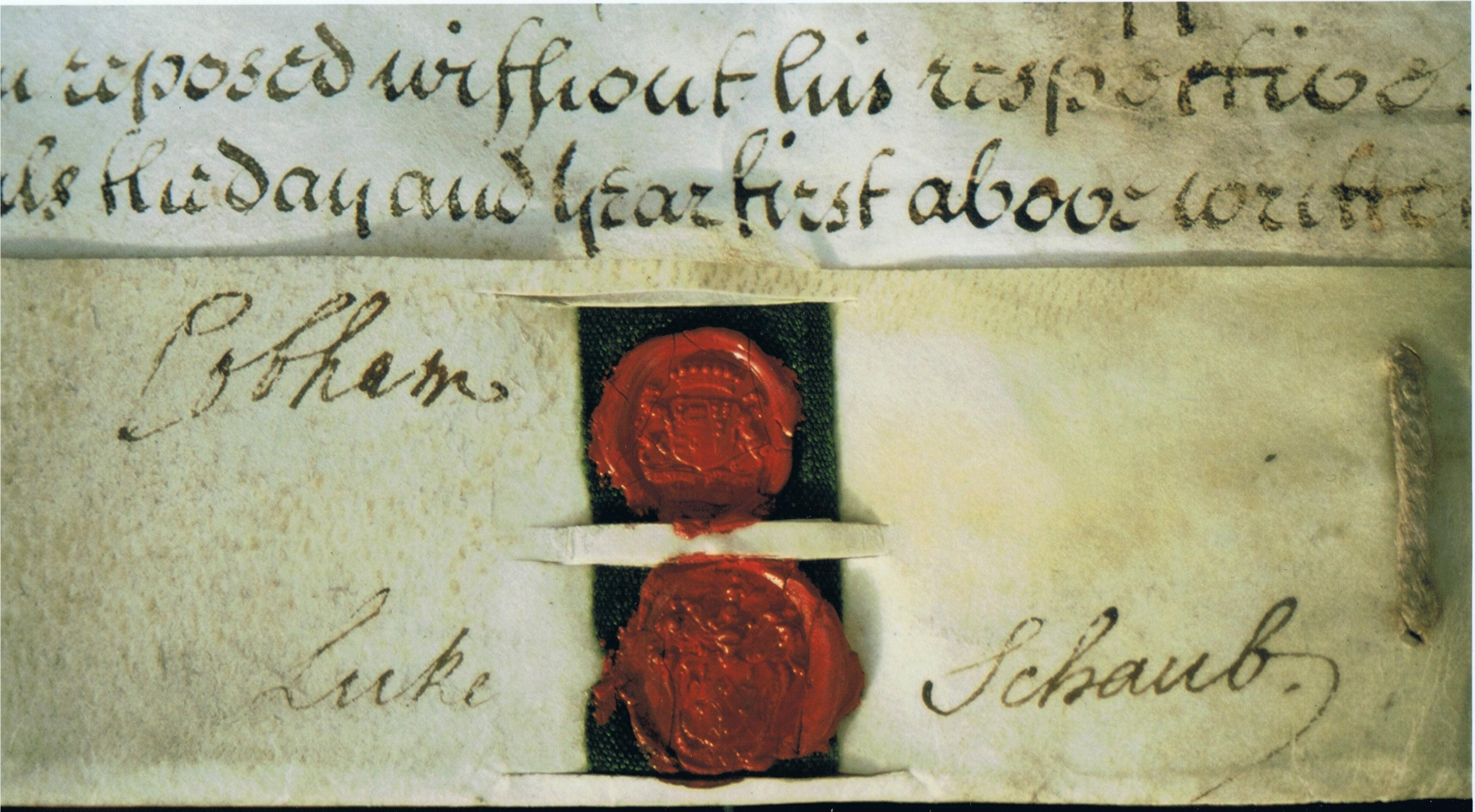
Cobham and Schaub's signatures on the De Salis – Fane marriage settlement.

On 7 January 1734/35, de Salis married Mary Fane (baptised 18 September 1710), eldest daughter of Charles, the first Viscount Fane. Sir Luke Schaub, Lord Harrington and Lord Cobham were among signatories of the marriage settlement. They were to have four sons: Charles (1736–1781), who died at Hieres; Peter (1738–1807), who became 3rd Count de Salis; Henry Jerome (1740–1810) and William (1741–1750).

De Salis was elected a Fellow of the Royal Society on 19 March 1741, proposed by Philip, 2nd Earl Stanhope (his wife's cousin), Martin Folkes (former president of the society), Andrew Mitchell, and his brother-in-law, Lord Sandwich. (He may have introduced Sandwich to his native bresaola and hence help to associate his brother-in-law with the sandwich).

== Diplomatic service in the Grisons ==
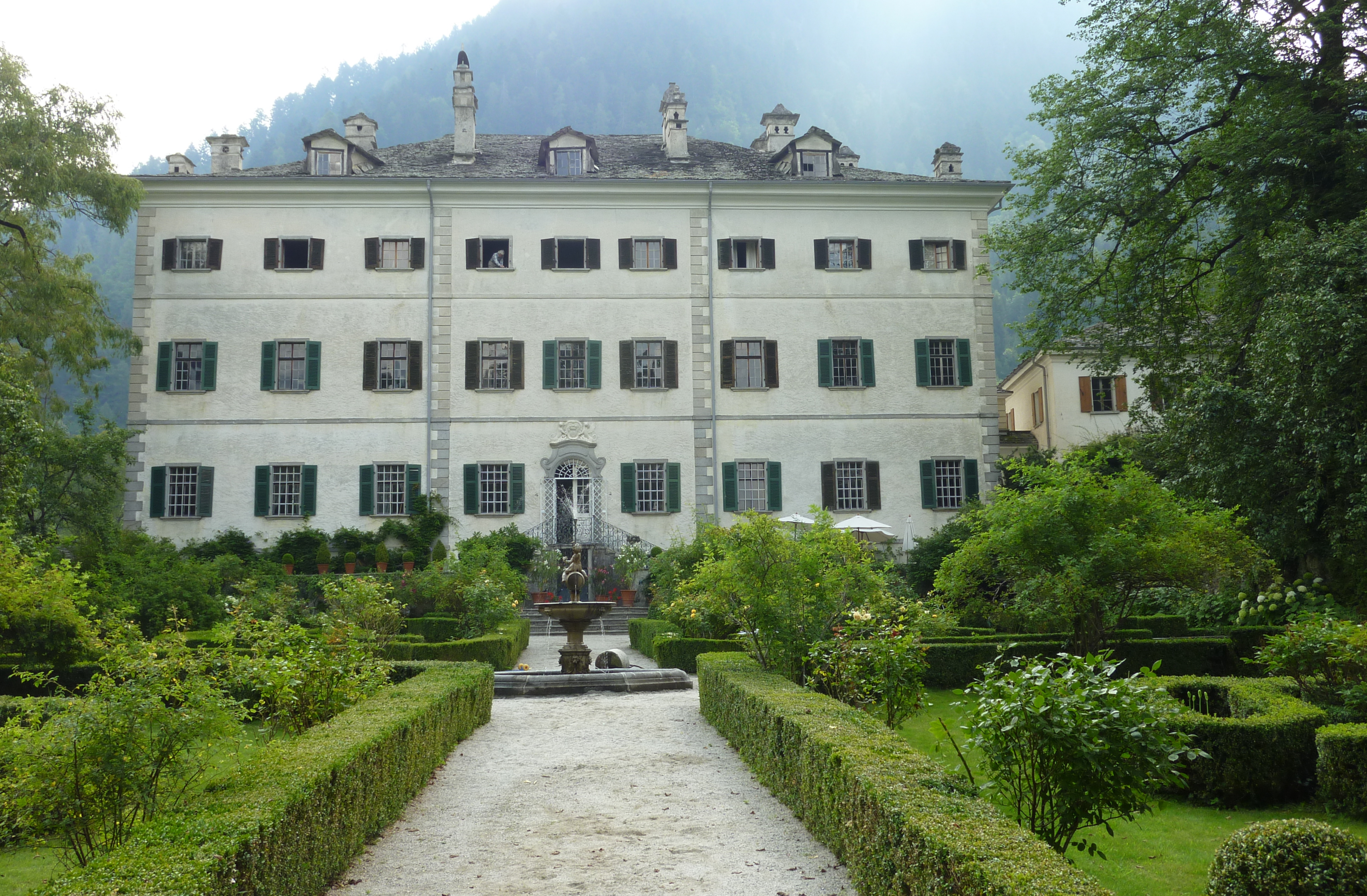
Palazzo Salis in Bondo, Switzerland

In 1743, de Salis was appointed British Resident. This means he served as King George II's extraordinary envoy or minister plenipotentiary to the Grisons Leagues. He arrived in Coire on 10 April 1743, and resided there in a public character until 13 March 1750.

In 1748, by a patent dated of 12 March Emperor Francis I created his father Peter, together with his descendants, a Count of the Holy Roman Empire; the father died the following year.

During and after his time as British Resident in the Grisons he lived in both Chur and in Chiavenna and, in the mid-1760s, he started to build an Anglo-Palladian double-pile summer villa in Bondo, a village in the Val Bregaglia between Chiavenna and the Maloja Pass. The house was completed by his son Peter in 1774.

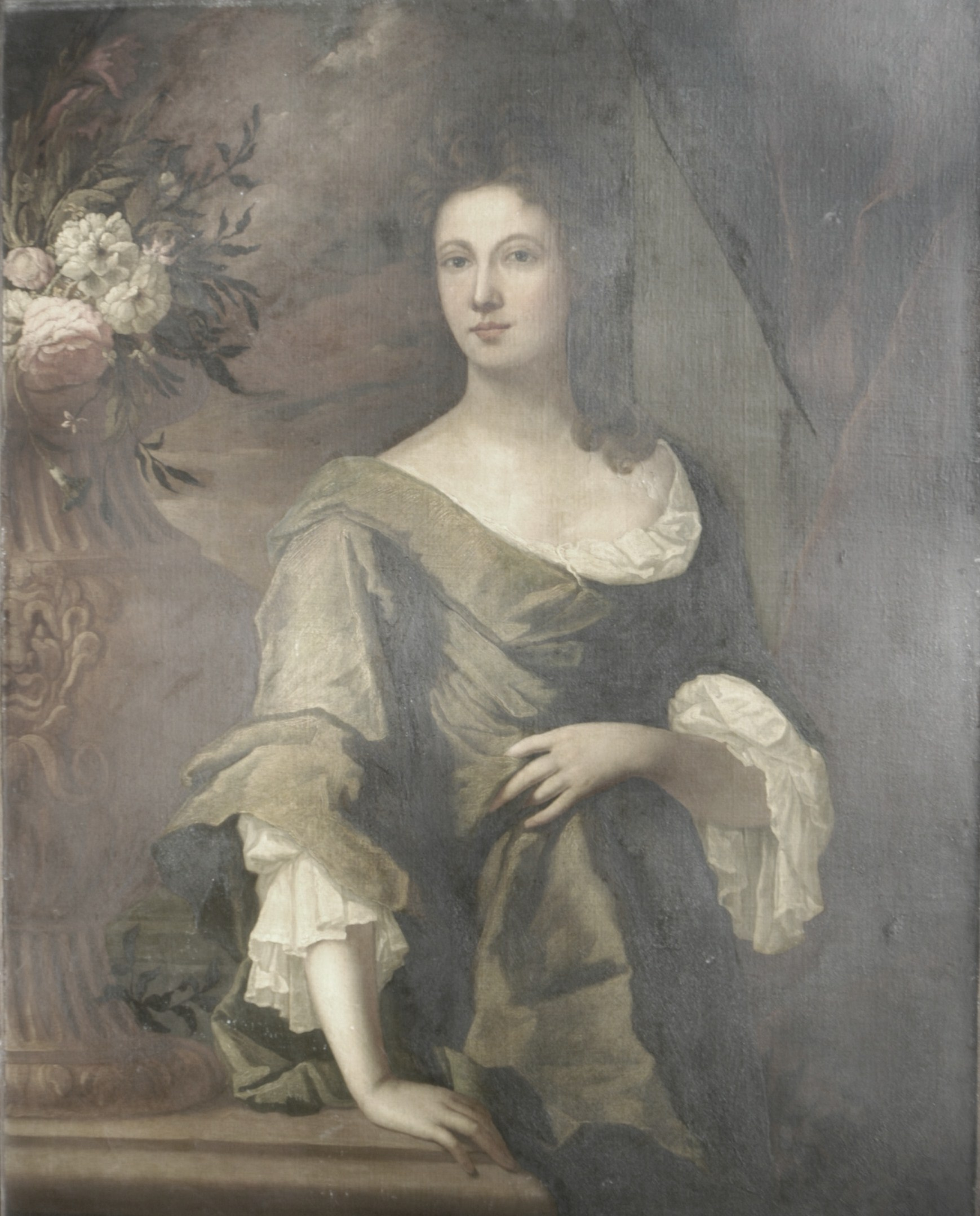
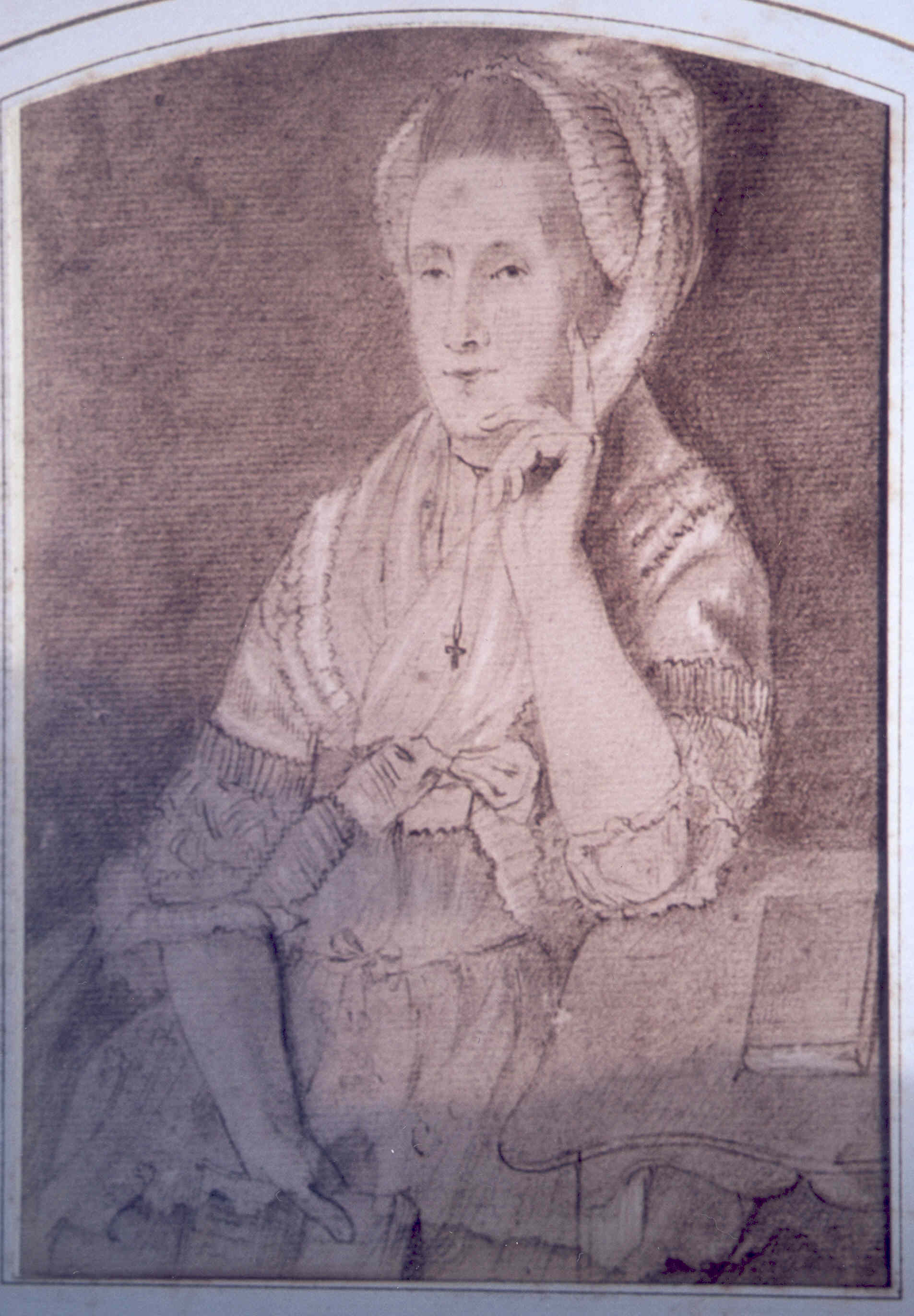
_{His wife, the Hon. Mary Fane, Madame de Salis, later Countess de Salis (died 1785)}

== Return to London ==
De Salis returned to London in 1768 and lived in Harley Street until his death on 8 August 1794, at the first door on the left-hand from Cavendish square (then no. 1). In the meantime, his wife lived in Knightsbridge, Margate, Marseilles, Harlington and, from 1780, at Smallborough Green, Isleworth. She died there of dropsy on 31 March 1785 aged 74 and was buried at Harlington, on the same day as her granddaughter, the first of six generations of her family to be buried there.

== Ancestors ==
Jerome de Salis's ancestors in three generations
Jerome de Salis	Peter, 1st Count de Salis-Soglio _{(1675–1749)}	Antonio de Salis-Soglio _{(1649–1735)}	Antonio de Salis-Soglio _{(Casa Antonio) (1609–82). Brother of Rudolf}
Jerome de Salis	Peter, 1st Count de Salis-Soglio _{(1675–1749)}	Antonio de Salis-Soglio _{(1649–1735)}	Cornelia de Salis _{(1624–96). Sister of Margaretha}
Jerome de Salis	Peter, 1st Count de Salis-Soglio _{(1675–1749)}	Perpetua v. Planta-Zuoz	Peter v. Planta-Zuoz _{(1617–1703)}
Jerome de Salis	Peter, 1st Count de Salis-Soglio _{(1675–1749)}	Perpetua v. Planta-Zuoz	Anna v. Perini
Jerome de Salis	Margherita v. Salis-Soglio _{(1678–1747)}	Ercole de Salis-Soglio _{(1650–1727)}	Rudolf de Salis-Soglio _{(Casa di Mezzo) (1608–80). Brother of Antonio}
Jerome de Salis	Margherita v. Salis-Soglio _{(1678–1747)}	Ercole de Salis-Soglio _{(1650–1727)}	Cleophea de Salis-Grusch _{(1622–98)}
Jerome de Salis	Margherita v. Salis-Soglio _{(1678–1747)}	Maria Magdalena de Salis-Seewis _{(1653–97)}	Jerome de Salis-Seewis _{(1621–1710)}
Jerome de Salis	Margherita v. Salis-Soglio _{(1678–1747)}	Maria Magdalena de Salis-Seewis _{(1653–97)}	Margherita de Salis _{(1627–1707). Sister of Cornelia}

== Notes ==
Regnal titles
Preceded by Peter, 1st Count	Count de Salis-Soglio; 1749–1794	Succeeded by Peter, 3rd Count
