= Peter, 3rd Count de Salis =

Count of the Holy Roman Empire (1738–1807)

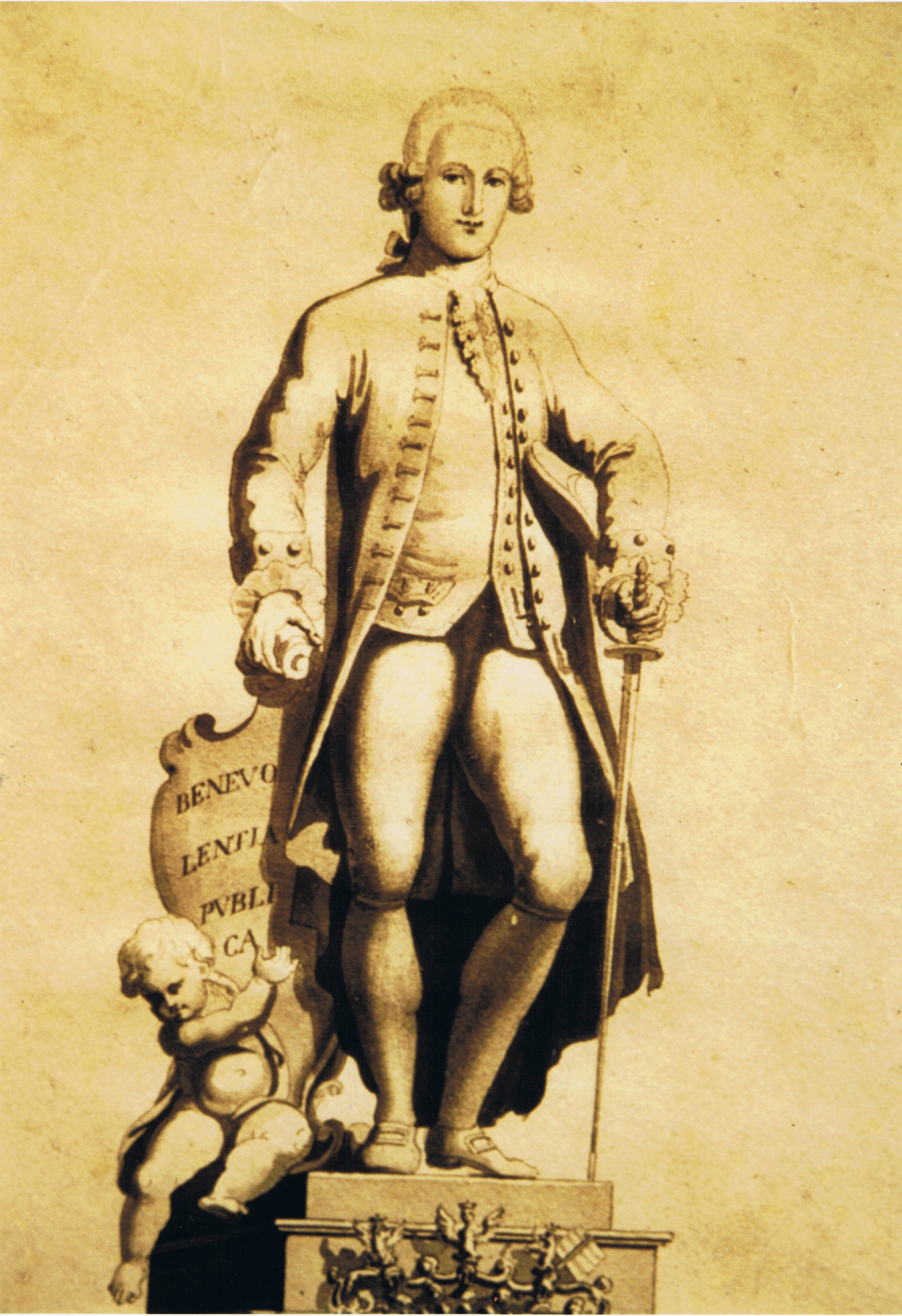
Upper part of the statue put up in honour of Peter de Salis, 3rd Count de Salis in 1782/83.

Peter de Salis, 3rd Count de Salis (28 June 1738 - 19 November 1807) was a soldier and official.

== Early life and education ==
He was the second son of Jerome De Salis by his wife Mary, daughter of the first Viscount Fane. He was educated with his brothers, Charles and Henry, in the Grisons, in Chur where his tutor was Johann Heinrich Lambert, and then at Eton.

== Career ==
He left Eton early in 1754 and was commissioned as an ensign in the 1st Regiment of Foot on 17 October 1754, which cost £900, subsequently he fought in the Seven Years' War, becoming a lieutenant on 27 October 1760. He left the army a captain.

Salis was Governor and Capitaine General of the Valtelline 1771–1773 and 1781–1783. Accordingly, in 1782 a statue was put up to him in a main square there. The statue was dismembered in 1797, but fragments survive.

== Personal life ==
Salis was sent by his father to the Grisons where he married a second cousin in 1763, she died, morte avec une fille en couches a year later. In 1765 he married a first cousin, she died 18 months later. In 1769 he married a combined third and fourth cousin, she had two sons with him and outlived him 22 years.

In March 1785 he inherited his mother's half share of the Bourchier-Fane estates in counties Limerick and Armagh, (Ireland). On 13 November 1785 he returned to England, landing with his family at Dover. From then he styled himself Esquire and lived mostly at 19 Orchard Street, near Portman Square; 11 Great Cumberland Street; in Hayes; and then at Hillingdon Park, Hillingdon-heath, near Uxbridge, a fine villa which Joseph Bonomi designed for him c. 1795–1797.

He died 19 November 1809 at his house on Hillingdon-Heath.

He was succeeded in his British estates by his elder son, Jerome and his younger son John/Johann/Giovanni seems to have inherited his Grisons property.

Regnal titles
Preceded by Jerome, 2nd Count de Salis	Count de Salis-Soglio; 1794–1807	Succeeded by Jerome, 4th Count de Salis
