= Hercules Salis (died 1727) =

Grisons politician (1650–1727)

- Portrait, c. 1700
- Born: 16 September 1650; Soglio, Three Leagues
- Died: 9 August 1727 (aged 76); Chur, Three Leagues
- Occupation: Politician
- Spouses: Maria Magdalena von Salis-Seewis (m. 1672) Luzia von Salis-Samedan (m. 1704)
- Relatives: Peter von Salis-Soglio (son-in-law)

Hercules Salis (16 September 1650 – 9 August 1727) was a politician from the Three Leagues. He was governor of the Valtellina in 1703–1705 and four times president of the League of God's House between 1709 and 1718, and he was regarded as the richest man in the Grisons of his time.

== Biography ==
Hercules Salis was born on 16 September 1650 in Soglio, now part of the municipality of Bregaglia. He was the son of Rudolf and of Cleophea von Salis-Grüsch. In 1672 he married Maria Magdalena von Salis-Seewis, and in 1704 Luzia von Salis-Samedan. His daughter Margarethe married Peter von Salis-Soglio.

Salis studied law at Padua from 1666 to 1669 and at Strasbourg in 1670. He was podestà of Morbegno in 1683–1685 and of the Bregaglia in 1687, and a councillor of Chur. In 1703–1705 he was governor (Landeshauptmann) of the Valtellina, and in 1709–1711, 1712–1713, 1715–1716 and 1717–1718 president (Bundspräsident) of the League of God's House. In 1710 he was involved in the Massner affair (Massnerhandel) surrounding Thomas Massner. Salis was regarded as the richest man in the Grisons of his time. He died in Chur on 9 August 1727.

== Bibliography ==
- A. von Sprecher, Stammbaum der Familie von Salis, 1941, plates 8/43, 10/126, 21/1, 21/9, 25/56
