= Peter von Salis-Soglio =

Grisons diplomat (1675–1749)

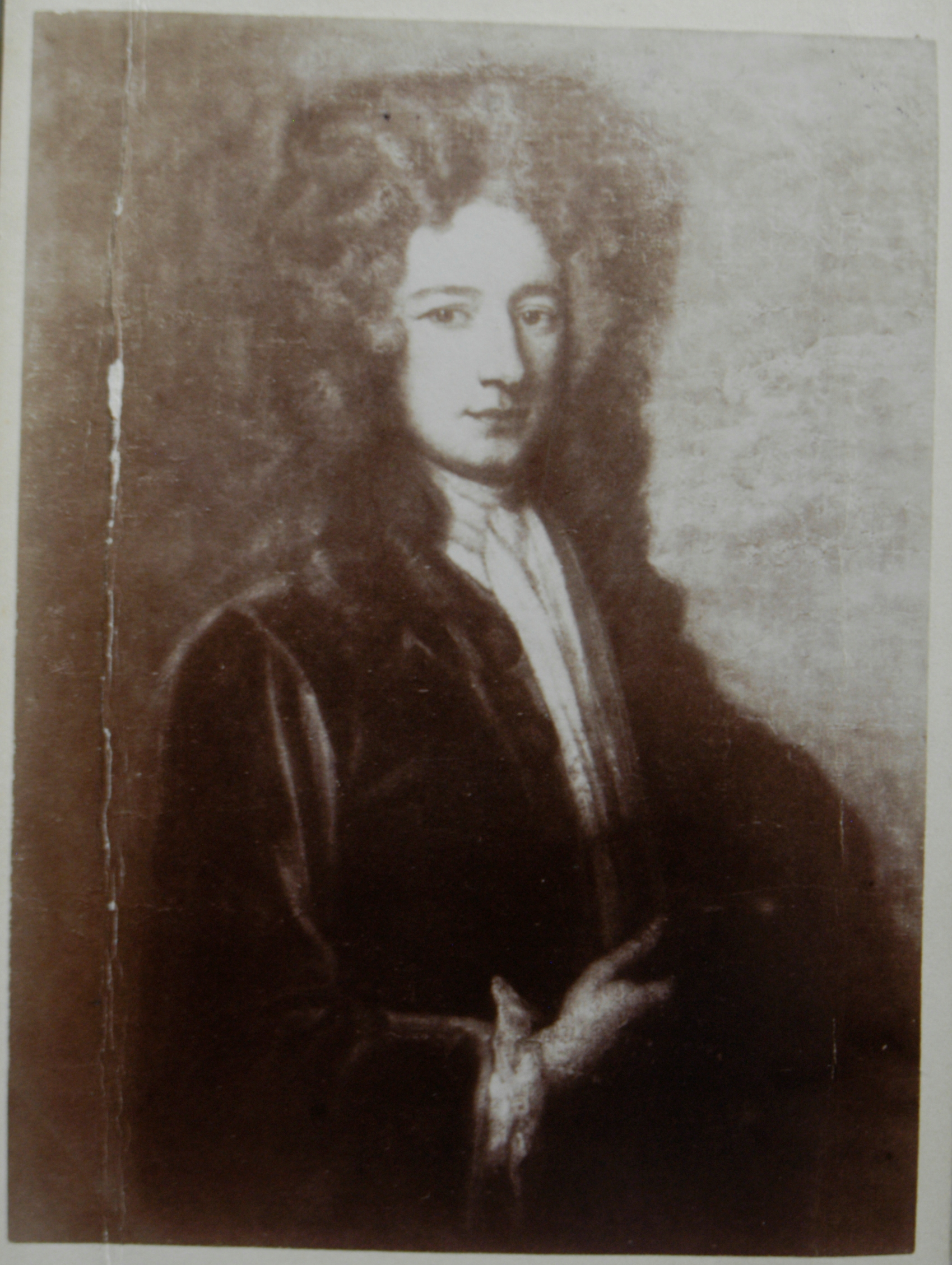
- Portrait by Godfrey Kneller, c. 1710
- Born: 12 September 1675; Soglio, Three Leagues
- Died: 14 February 1749 (aged 73); Chur, Three Leagues
- Occupations: Diplomat; military officer
- Spouse: Margarethe von Salis-Soglio
- Children: Hieronymus

Peter von Salis-Soglio (12 September 1675 – 14 February 1749), also called the Envoyé, was a diplomat and officer from the Three Leagues. In 1709 he was appointed the Grisons envoy to the peace negotiations in The Hague, and until 1713 he spent several long periods in London on diplomatic missions. He rarely held office, but his diplomatic skills and great wealth allowed him to play the role of an éminence grise, and he is regarded as the leading Grisons statesman of his time.

== Biography ==
Peter von Salis-Soglio was born on 12 September 1675 in Soglio, now part of the municipality of Bregaglia. He was the son of Anton, vicari (judge) in the Valtellina, and Perpetua von Planta. He married Margarethe von Salis-Soglio, daughter of Hercules. His daughter Margarethe married Anton von Salis-Soglio.

Salis served as a major in the Swiss Guards in France, in the regiment of his uncle, the brigadier Johann Baptista von Salis. He left in 1702, when he could not take over a company. He continued his military career in the Grisons, as colonel of the League of God's House and in the fortification of the St. Luzisteig. He represented the Bregaglia at the congresses of the Three Leagues (Bundeskongresse) and lived in Chur as a Hintersässe (resident without citizenship).

In 1709 he was appointed the Grisons envoy to the peace negotiations in The Hague, which is why he was also called the Envoyé. Between 1709 and 1713 he stayed in London several times for long periods on diplomatic missions. He did not achieve his aim, the recognition and guarantee of the independence and territorial sovereignty of the Three Leagues by all the great powers; the result was limited to the alliance treaty of 1713 with Holland. Back in Chur, he administered the customs duties of the Three Leagues, which had been granted to him in 1712 to cover the costs of his mission.

The silk-weaving business he set up in Chiavenna in 1715 closed in 1722. His efforts to obtain better terms when the second capitulation with Milan was concluded in 1726 were unsuccessful. During the unrest in Chur that followed, he brought about the fall of the mayor (Bürgermeister), Johann Baptista von Tscharner, and was admitted as a citizen of Chur for 18,000 guilders. With his wife's inheritance he built one of the most important Baroque manor houses in the Grisons in 1727–1731, today the Altes Gebäu in Chur, and laid out an exotic garden next to it.

Salis rarely held office, but thanks to his diplomatic skills and great wealth he played the role of an éminence grise. In a veritable parallel diplomacy he conducted his own foreign policy, and foreign envoys called on him first, even before the elected government of the heads of the leagues (Häupter). He is regarded as the leading, most brilliant and richest Grisons statesman of his time. From 1748 he was an Imperial Count (Reichsgraf). His son Hieronymus founded the English line of the family. Salis died in Chur on 14 February 1749.

== Bibliography ==
- H. Roth, Envoyé Peter von Salis-Soglio, 1970
- M. Hilfiker, "Chur im 17. und 18. Jahrhundert", in Churer Stadtgeschichte, 2, 1993, 54–57
