= William Fane de Salis (Royal Navy officer) =

Royal Navy Admiral (1858–1939)

Admiral Sir William Fane de Salis KBE MVO JP
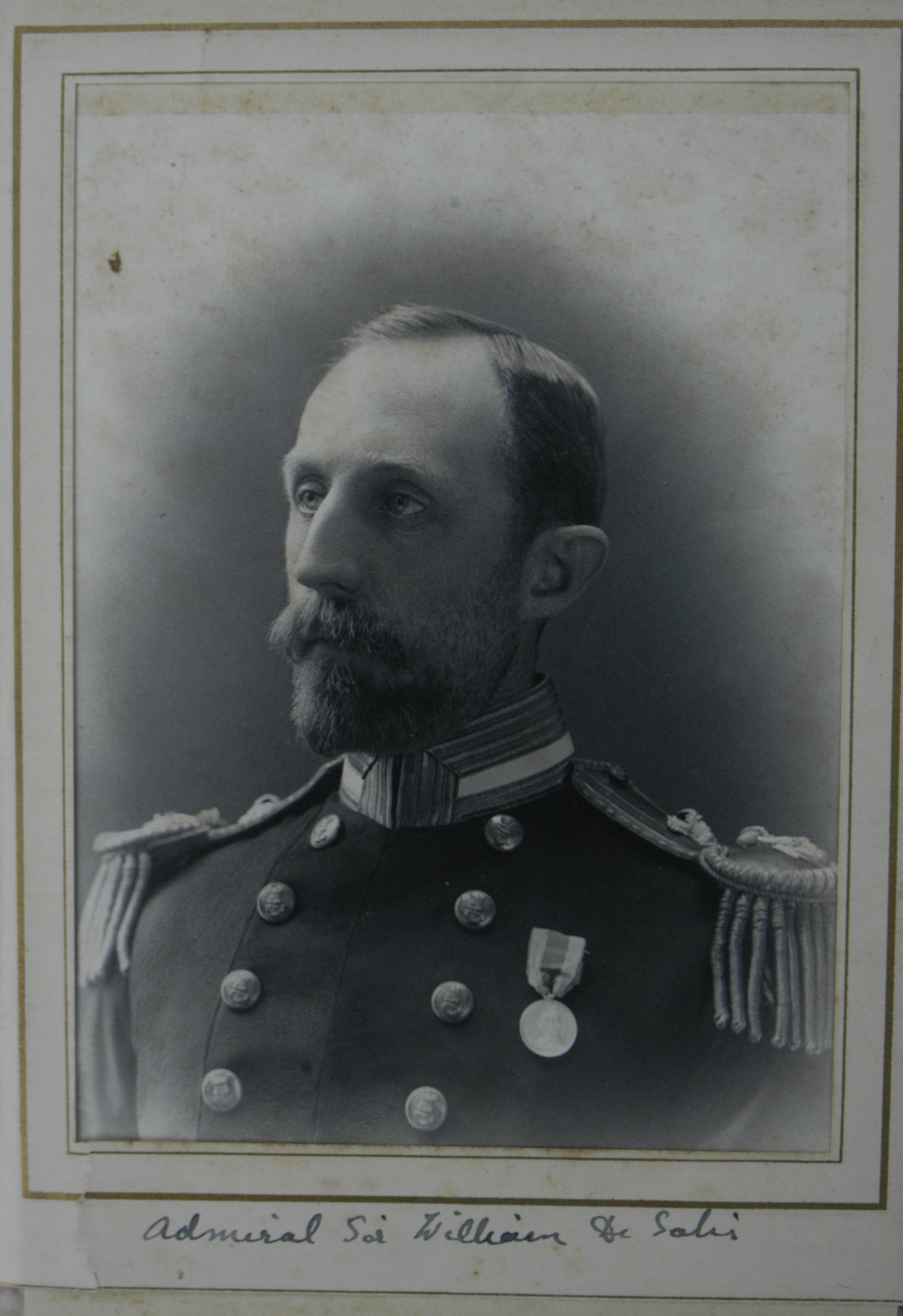
- Cabinet photograph of William Fane de Salis as a captain, circa 1900.jpg
- Born: 21 July 1858; Fringford
- Died: 23 January 1939 (aged 80); Roche Court, Fareham
- Military career
- Allegiance: United Kingdom
- Branch: Royal Navy
- Service years: 1871–1913
- Rank: Admiral
- Commands: HMS Orion; HMS Juno; HMS Revenge; HMS Jupiter; HMS Russell
- Conflicts: Dervish War; First World War

Admiral Sir William Fane de Salis, KBE, MVO, JP (21 July 1858 – 23 January 1939) was a Royal Navy admiral during the early years of the First World War.

== Background ==
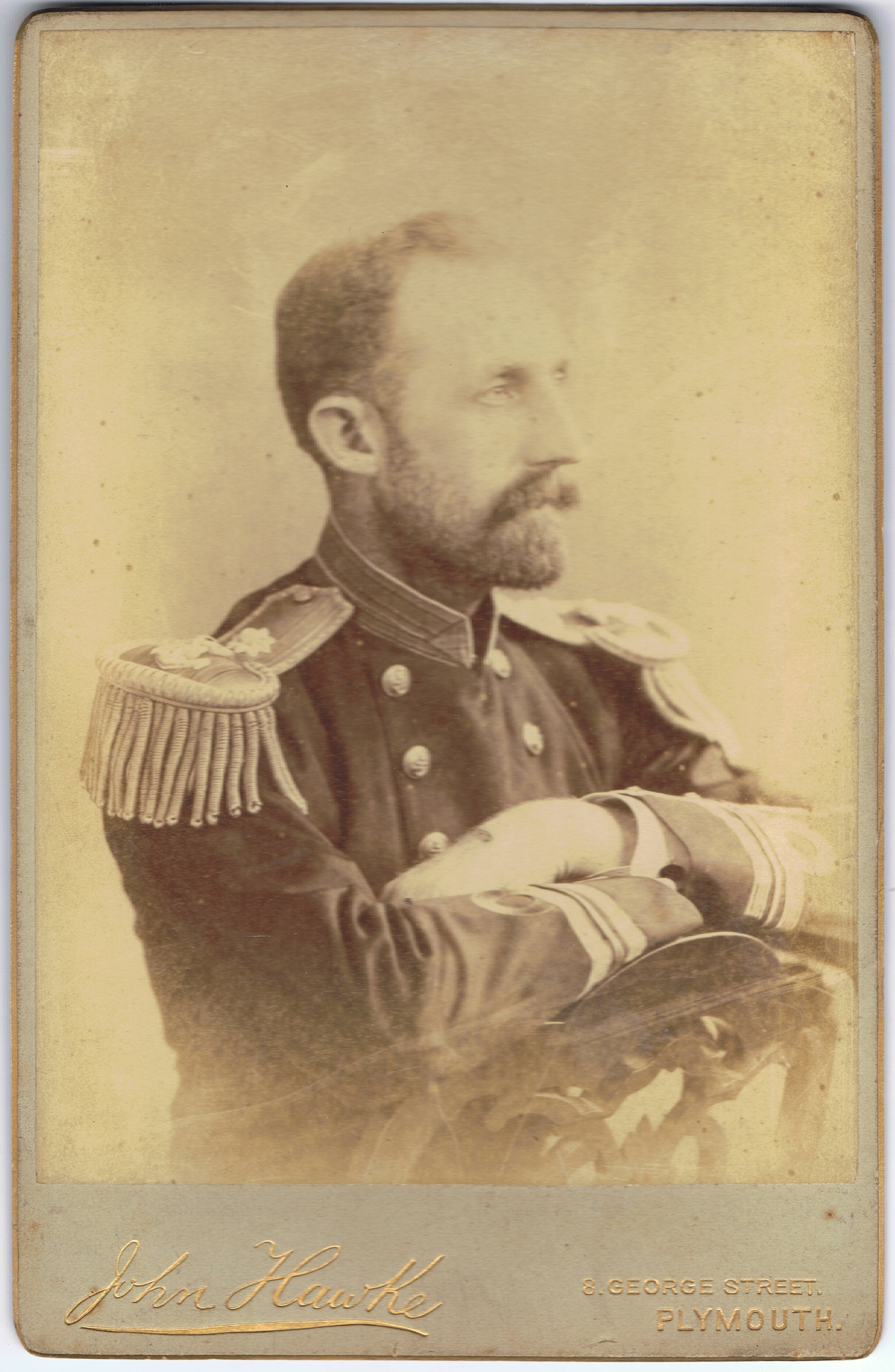
William Fane De Salis

A nephew of William Fane de Salis and third of the four sons of Rev. Henry Jerome Fane De Salis of Portnall Park (the seventh son of the 4th Count de Salis), his brothers were Rodolph Fane De Salis, Cecil Fane De Salis and Charles Fane De Salis.

== Naval career ==
de Salis entered the Royal Navy, HMS Britannia, in 1871; and served in the Niger (1886) and the Dervish War expeditions (1901). After promotion to captain on 30 June 1901, he was on 5 September 1902 appointed in command of the ironclad HMS Orion, depot-ship for at Malta for torpedo-boats in the Mediterranean Fleet.

He was naval ADC to Kings Edward VII and George V, 1909-1910, was promoted to rear-admiral in 1911, and retired from the navy in 1913. He served as a captain in the Royal Naval Reserve's Yacht Patrol, 6 March 1915 – 1916; Vice-Admiral, Head of Mission to Portugal, 9 June 1916. He served on the following: HMS Russell; HMS Jupiter; HMS Revenge; HMS Gladiator; HMS Blake; HMS Juno; HMS Mersey; HMS Scout; HMS Haughty; and HMTB 87.

de Salis was appointed a Member of the Royal Victorian Order in 1904, and knighted as a Knight Commander of the Order of the British Empire in 1922. He received the Prussian Order of the Red Eagle in 1904 (2 class) and the Portuguese Order of the Tower and Sword in 1916. He was Justice of the peace (JP) of Hampshire from 1904.

== Marriages and family ==
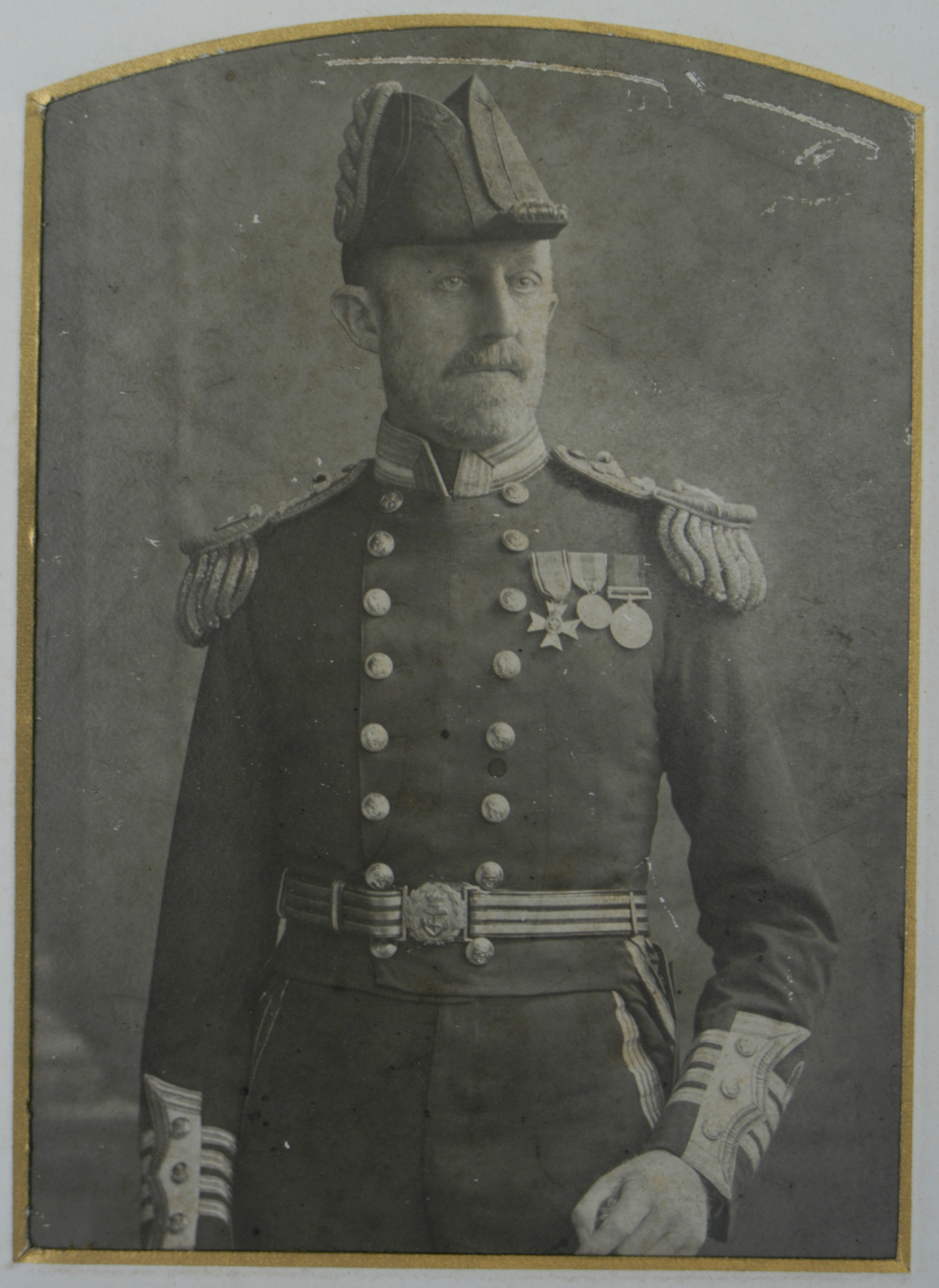
Captain William de Salis

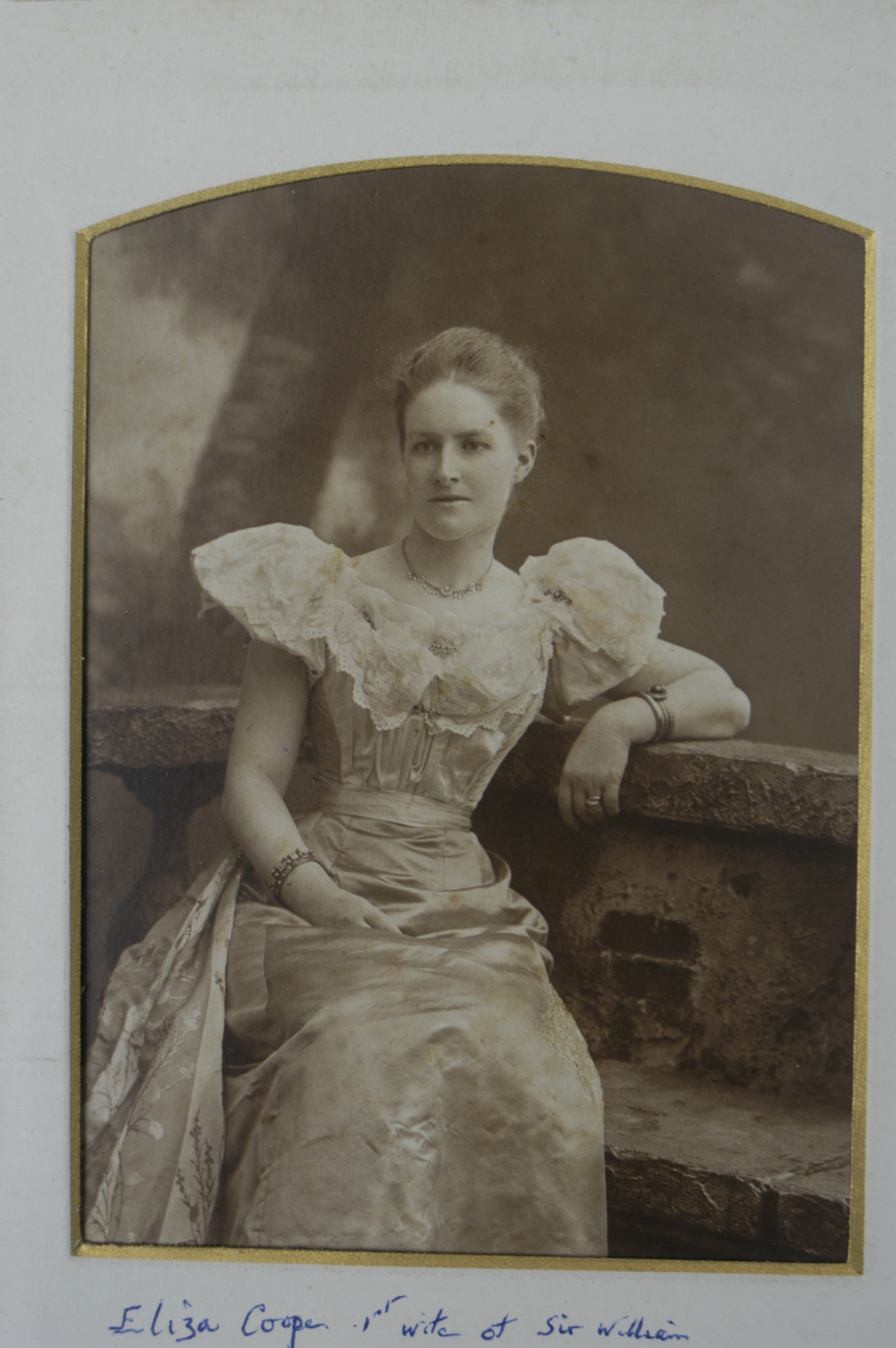
Eliza Jesser Coope (1867-1920), c. 1889

- ∞ I. 14.5.1889, Eliza Jesser Coope, (Falmouth, 1867, † Chichester, 29.10.1919), elder daughter of Captain William Jesser Coope, of Claremont, Mayfield, Sussex, and Rouwkoup House, Rondebosch, Cape Colony;
- ∞ II. St. Stephen Walbrook, London, 20.2.1924, Mabel Dorothy Rawstorne, of Roche Court, (20.3.1889, †Roche Court, Fareham, 15.1.1936), daughter and heir of Henry Feilden Rawstorne (*1859 – †24.6.1924) of Roche Court, north Fareham, Hants., England, (second son of Ven. Archdeacon Robert Atherton Rawstorne, (1824–1902), of Balderstone Grange, Lancs.), by (∞1887) Mabel Katharina (†1892) only child and heir of Sir John Brocas Whalley-Smythe-Gardiner, 4th & last Bart. of Roche Court (†1868).

Issue:

- Rodolph Henry, (Portnall 25.5.1890, † Sussex 1.6.1972), DSC; Deputy-Lieutenant (West Sussex); CBE; OBE; Dover Patrol and Heligo Bight; with Admiral Jellicoe 1919. Despatches (twice). Married, ∞Rosyth, 14.9.1920, Madelaine Marion Catherine Heath, (Malta ... 2.1892, † Up Marden 29/30.3.1978), daughter of Admiral Sir (Herbert) Leopold Heath, KCB, MVO. Madelaine served in No.8 Stationary Hospital Wimereux & B.R.C.S. motor ambulance convoy at Étaples.
- Ursula Eva, (Stoke Damerel 21.3.1892, † Hampstead 22.11.1981), married, Frederic Newton Attwood, CBE (1941), of Burchetts, Milford, Surrey; (†Milford 21.10.1973); Rear-Admiral, RN 1904, served 1914-1918, & 1939-45.
- Antony, (Sheerness 11.5.1896, † Wentworth, Surrey, 6.1.1976), Captain, Royal Navy, DSO; (at Jutland); of Fair Winds, Virginia Water. Married, ∞ firstly, 3.10.1925, (Margaret) Honor Bindloss, (bapt. 1.5.1901, † ... 8.7.1926), daughter of Dr. (Major) Arthur Henry Bindloss, (*Russia 1864-?) physician & surgeon, of The Old house, Harrow-on-the-Hill; he married secondly, 10.9.1948, Phyllis Marion Dicks, (Portsea Island, 1900, † Virginia Water, 19.7.2002 (aged 102)).
