= William Fane De Salis =

William Fane De Salis may refer to:

- William Fane De Salis (admiral) (1858–1939)
- William Andrew Salius Fane de Salis (1812–1896), businessman, colonialist, and barrister
