= Rodolph Fane De Salis =

English engineer and business executive

Rodolph with his wife Edith and daughter Margery, circa 1890.

Part of Singer & Company, Ltd, directors' report, 31 July 1917.

Rodolph Fane De Salis, (Fringford, 10 December 1854 - 26 November 1931 (buried in Virginia Water)), FGS, AMICE, civil engineer who was a director and then chairman of the Singer Motor Company of Coventry; President of the Canal Association; the last chairman of the Grand Junction Canal Co.; and director of the North Staffordshire Railway, the Great Central Railway, and of the Coventry Canal.

A nephew of William Fane de Salis and the eldest son of Rev. Henry-Jerome Fane De Salis, of Fringford and then Portnall Park, Virginia Water, the seventh son of the 4th Count de Salis, he was educated at Eton and (Trinity Hall, Cantab). Sir Cecil Fane De Salis and Charles De Salis, Bishop of Taunton were two of his three brothers. He was also a sometime Lieutenant in the Surrey Volunteer Regiment.

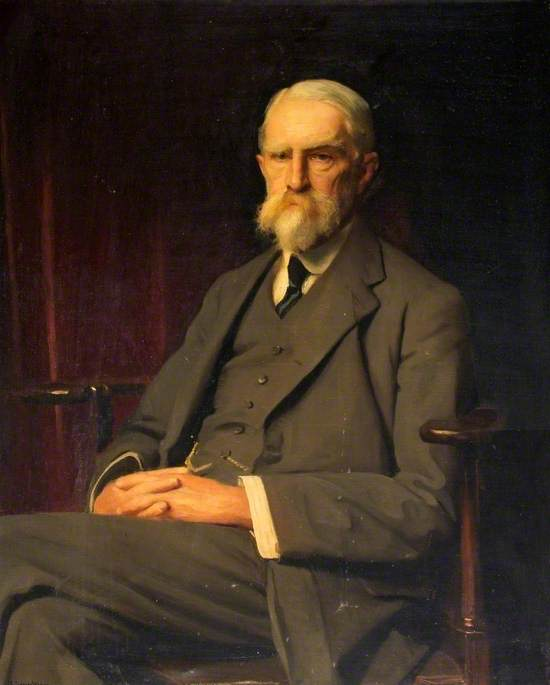
Portrait by George Spencer Watson, RA (British painter died in 1934).

Lived in Acton, Westminster and Barkeston gardens, Kensington. He inherited Portnall Park, Virginia Water from his father in 1915 and sold it in 1924. He lived subsequently at Finmere house, county Buckingham, which was within five miles of where he was born.

His recreations were listed in Who's Who as motoring and golfing. A member of United University Club and Garrick Club. His cars had number plates DU 4726 and DU 6765.

== Marriages ==
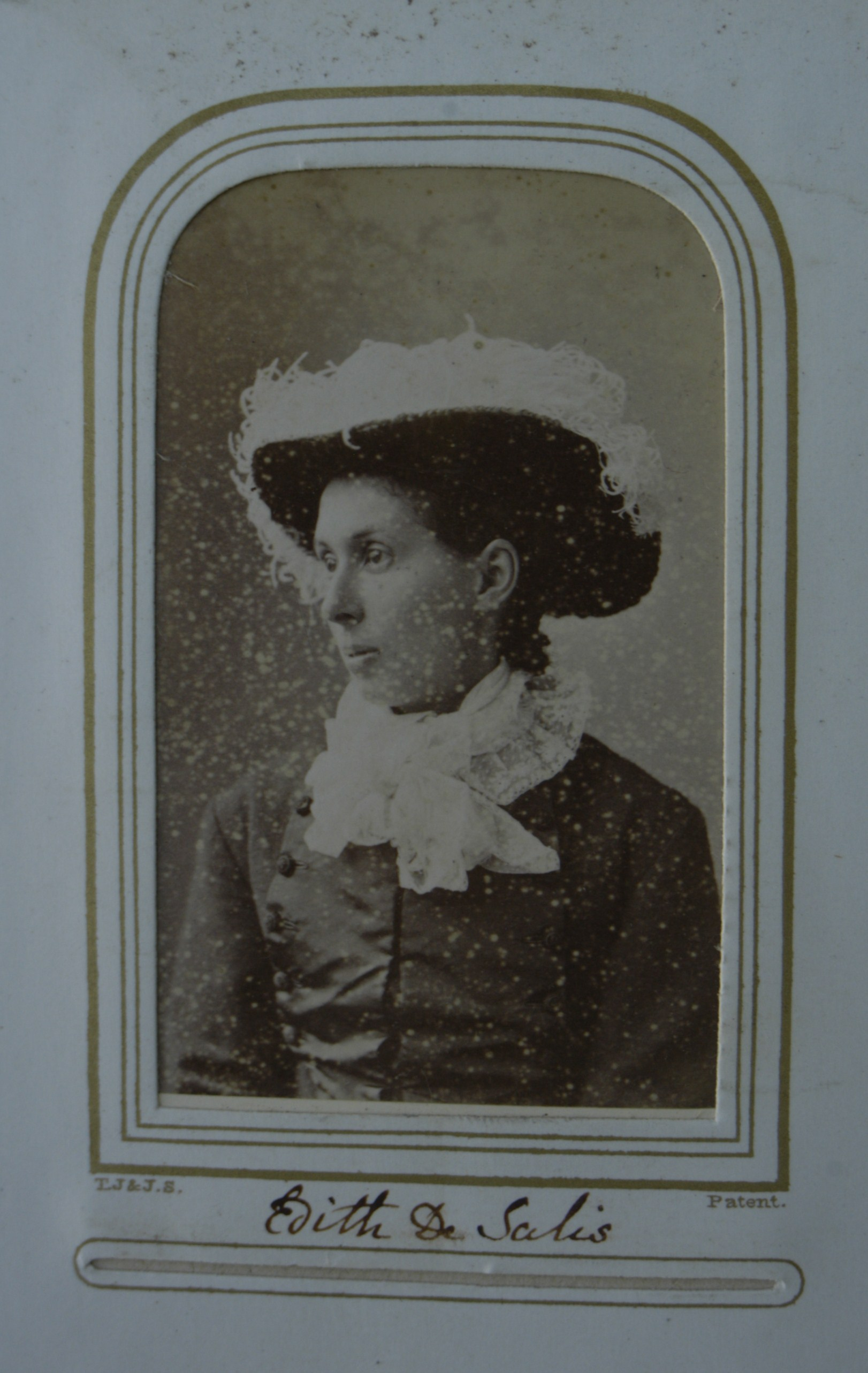
Mrs. Rodolph Fane De Salis, aka Edith Rousby, circa 1880.

He married firstly, Cottisford 27.6.1878, Edith Louisa Catherine (Southsea, 1855- 21.10.1920), daughter of E. Edwards Rousby (d.1875) of Cottisford House, Oxfordshire, by Louisa Catherine, daughter of Major Johns, Royal Marine Forces, and had one daughter:

Edith Margery (Margaret), (London 12.7.1882 - †Folkestone 22.6.1932), probably the actress Margery Fane.

He married secondly on 20.12.1921, Edith Dorothea, (1871 - †Oxford 3.9.1931 (buried Virginia Water), daughter of Canon T. Poole Morgan of Kilnagleary, county Cork.

His daughter Margery married:

- first: on 16.6.1910, Dr. Hugh Wansey Bayly, (Warminster 10.5.1873 - †Gt. Snoring, Norfolk ...1946); Clare coll., Cantab. (MA); MC, MRCS, LRCP (marriage dissolved 1913).
- second: Kensington 1914, Charles James Vavasour Sandford, (Great Harwood, Lancs. 1875- †Killed c. 7.5.1917);
- third: 10.1.1918, (Frederick) Lock Whittaker, (1880-?); sometime of 19 Radnor Park Road, Folkestone. Retired actor/stage artist by 1932;

By her first husband she had a daughter:

Jessy 'Jena' Georgiana (or Georgina) Fane Bayly, aka Mrs Dunkerley (1911 - †Wiltshire 18.10.2003).

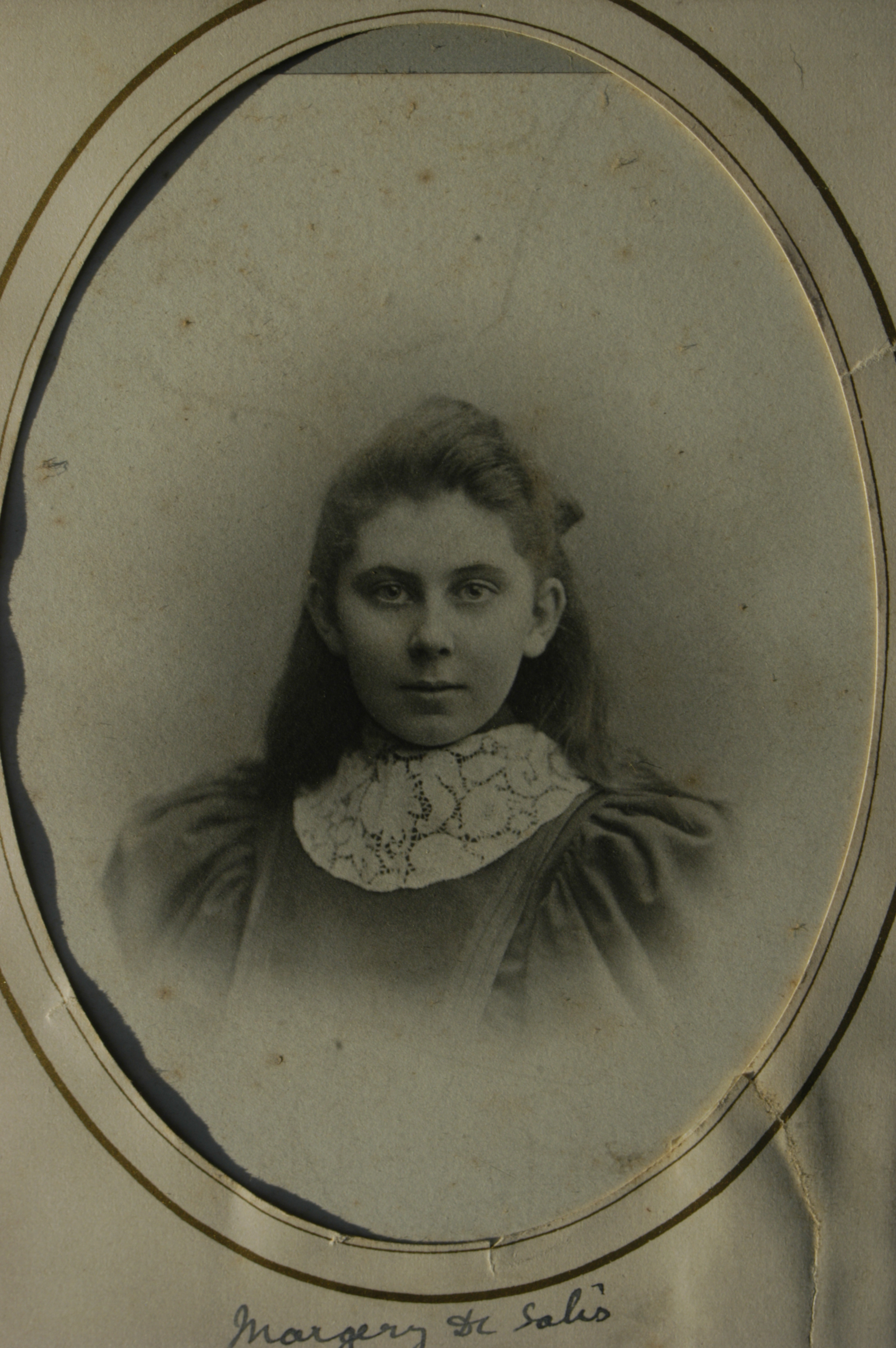
Margery Fane De Salis in around 1890.

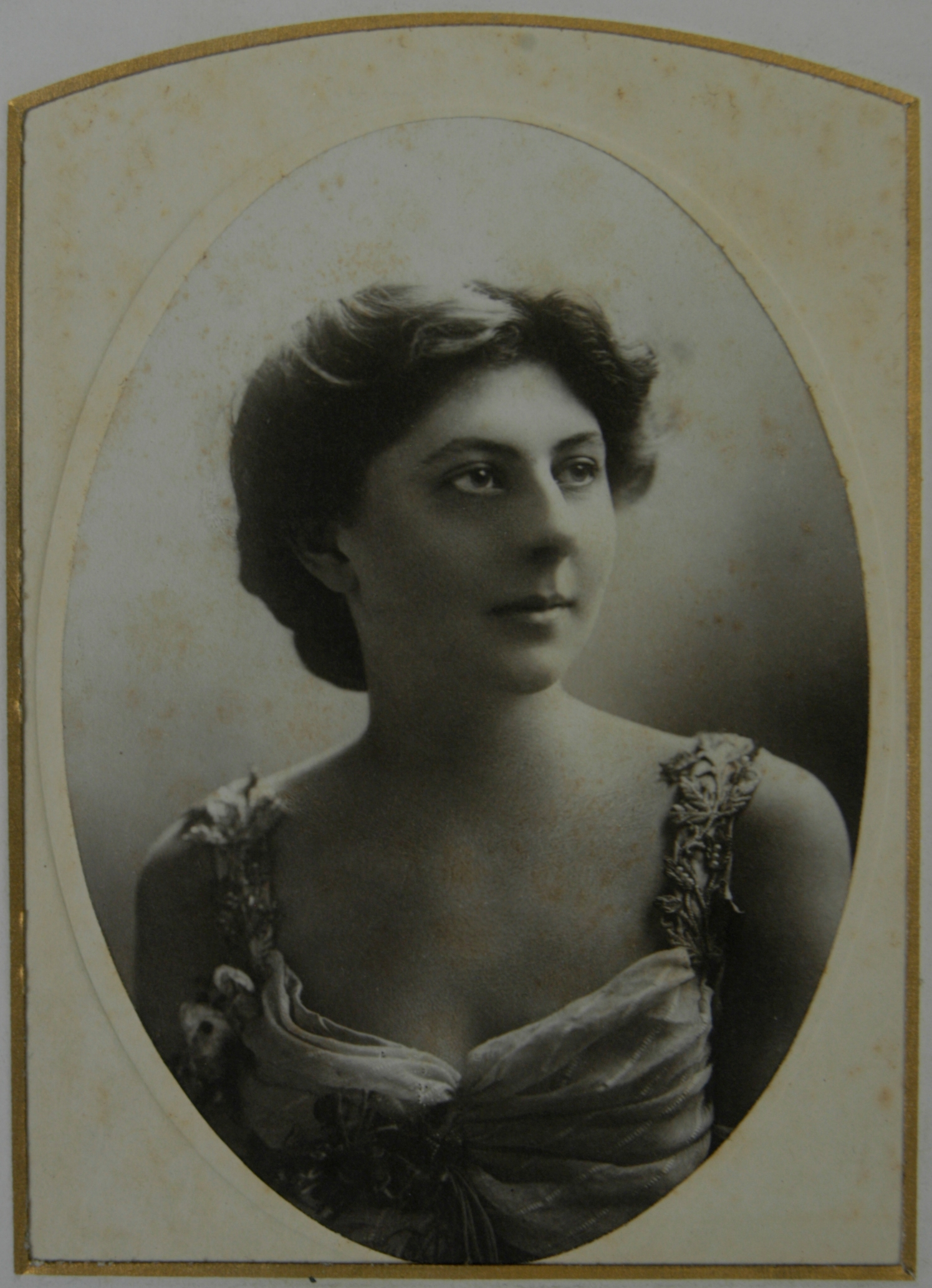
Photograph of Edith Margaret, Margery or Marjorie, Fane de Salis, Mrs. Thomas Frederick Lock Whittaker (born 1882 died 1932).

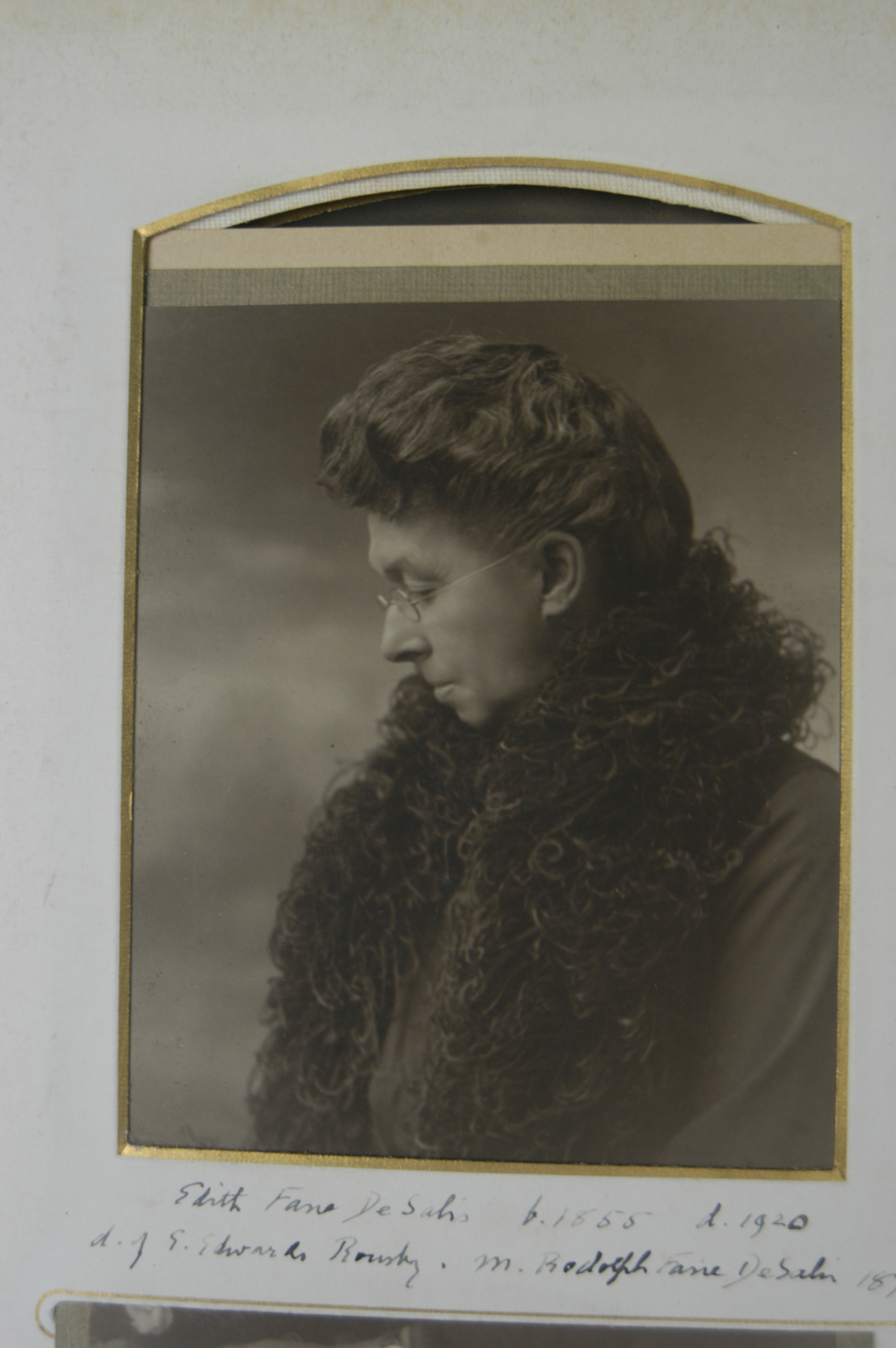
Edith Rousby.

== Portrait ==
He was photographed by Bassano in 1929.

With his wife he was photographed by Lafayette in 1927.

== Note ==
Do not confuse him with his first cousin-once-removed, Henry Rodolph de Salis, also known as Rodolph and involved with canals and civil engineering.
