= Henry de Salis =

English cleric

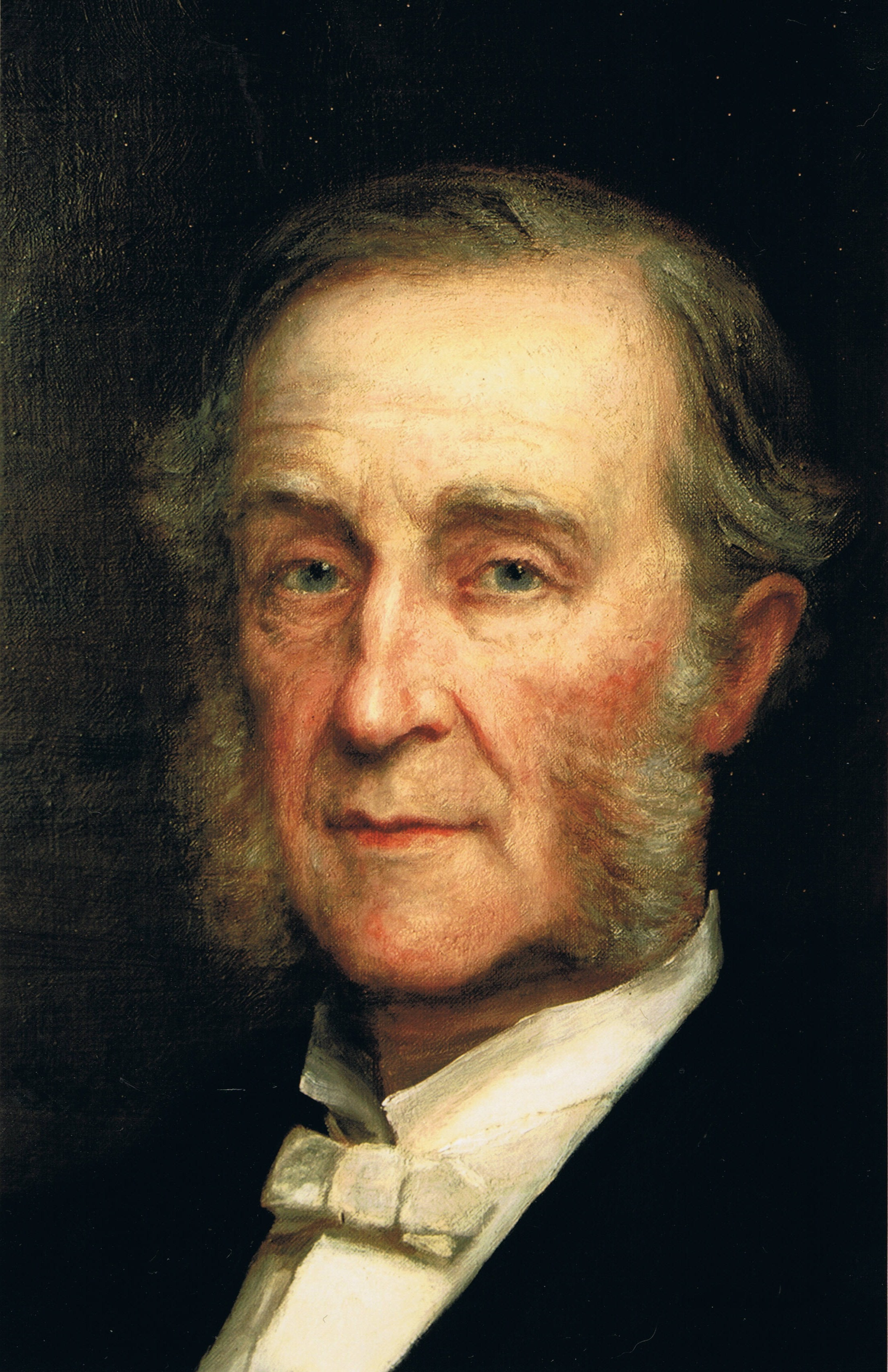
Detail of a portrait of Rev. Henry Jerome Fane de Salis by Henry Jamyn Brooks.

Henry Jerome Augustine Fane de Salis (born Pisa 16 January 1828, died Virginia Water 18 February 1915) was an English cleric and JP (Surrey), of Portnall Park, Virginia Water.

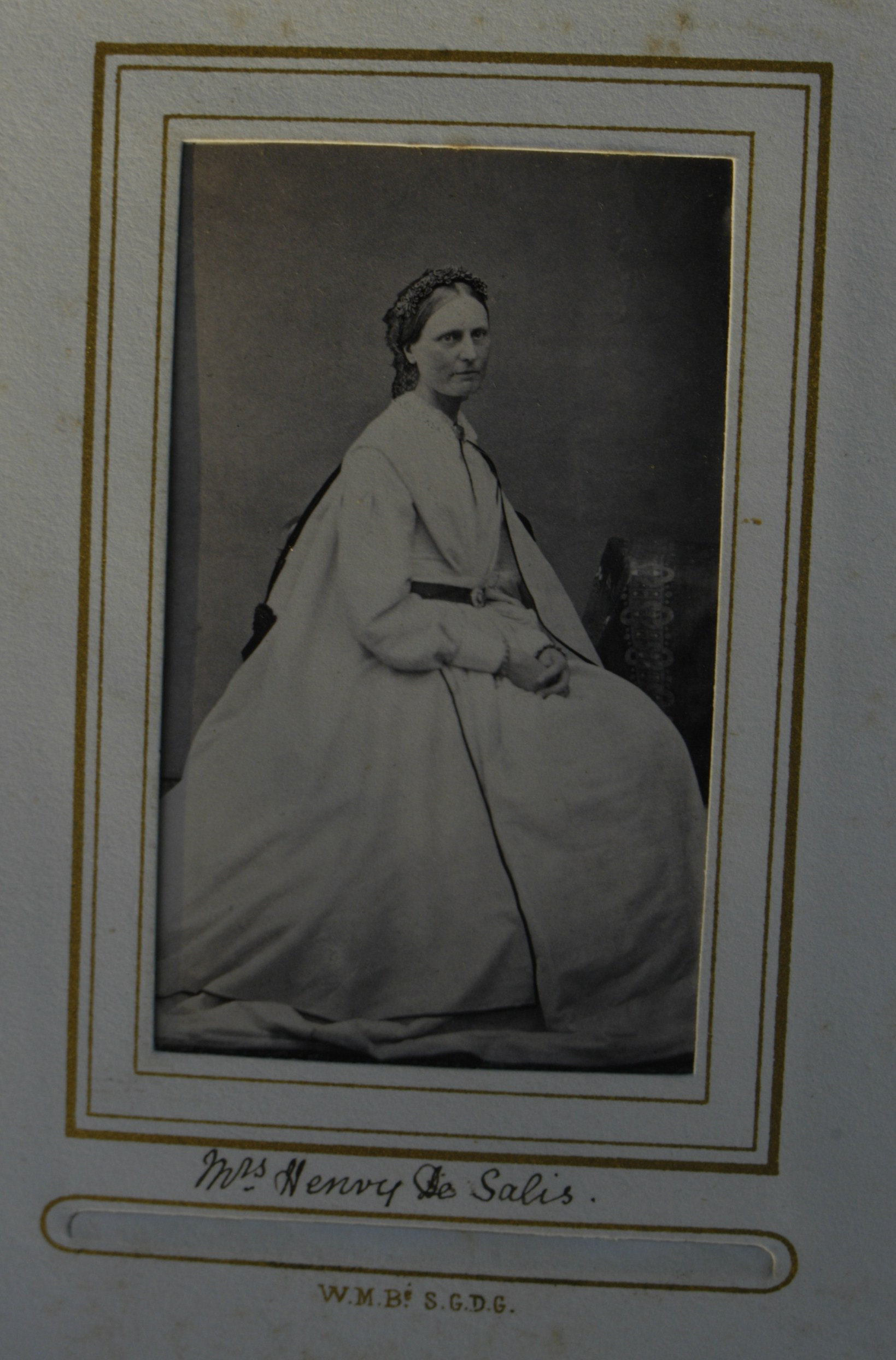
Grace E. Henley (1823-1898), from 1853 wife to de Salis.

== Life ==
The seventh son of the 4th Count de Salis, he was educated at Eton College, and then Exeter College, Oxford, where he matriculated in 1847 and graduated B.A. in 1850.

De Salis was Rector of Fringford from 1852 until 1872. He then inherited Portnall Park, Virginia Water, Staines, Surrey from his brother-in-law, Thomas-Chaloner Bisse-Challoner (1788-1872) Later he was chairman of Egham's Holloway Sanatorium, and of the Old Windsor Board of Guardians.

== Marriage ==
He married, on 29 March 1853, (Minnie) Grace Elizabeth Henley, (8 July 1823 - Virginia Water 28 August 1898), daughter of J. W. Henley, MP, and Georgina Fane. They had four sons- Rodolph, Cecil, William, and Charles Fane de Salis- and a daughter, Georgiana (1861-1910)
