= Thomas-Chaloner Bisse-Challoner =

British gentleman and militia colonel

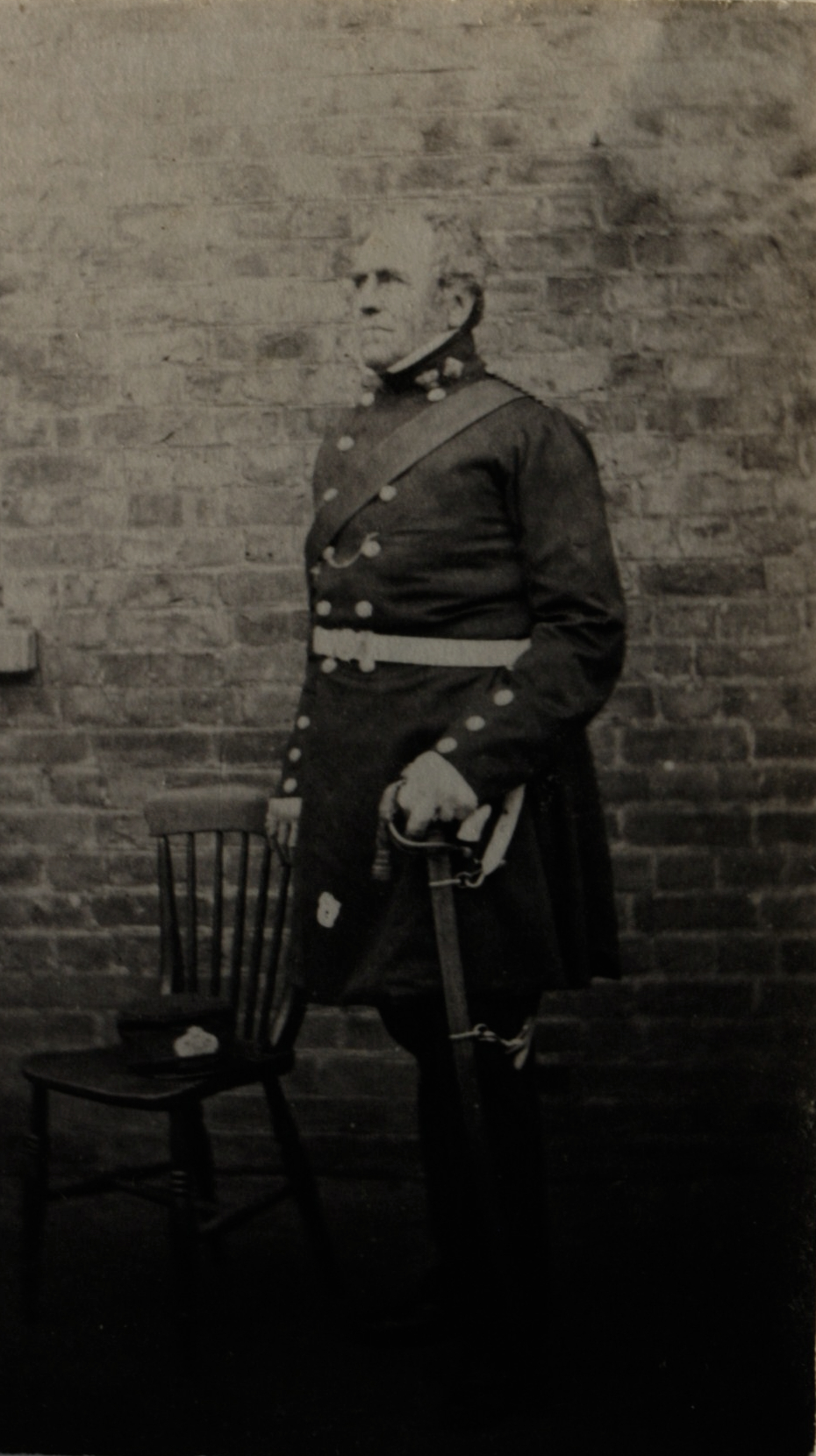
- Born: 11 December 1788
- Died: 26 July 1872 (aged 83)
- Occupations: Militia Colonel and Magistrate

Thomas-Chaloner Bisse-Challoner (1788–1872) DL, JP, was a British gentleman and militia colonel. He enlarged the former country house and landscape garden at Portnall Park, Virginia Water (then considered Egham Heath), and so laid the foundation for the Wentworth Estate and housing development in the surrounding area.

== Background ==
Challoner was the only son of the Rev. Thomas Bisse (c.1754–13 November 1828), of Portnall Park, Virginia Water and his first wife, Katherine Townsend (d.1815/ 16). His ancestor was Philip Bisse.

He was educated at Eton College (c.1802–1805), and matriculated at Trinity College, Oxford in 1806.

== Inheritance ==
In 1829, in order to inherit according to the will of his maternal great-aunt Mrs Challoner, Bisse changed his name to Bisse-Challoner. This was announced in The London Gazette on 22 January 1829: "...he may (in testimony of his respect for the memory of his maternal great-aunt Lydia, widow and relict of George Challoner, of Hales-hall, in the parish of Cheadle, in the county of Stafford, under whose will he derives considerable property) assume and use the surname of Challoner, in addition to and after that of Bisse, and also bear the arms of Challoner quarterly with those of Bisse".

== Career ==
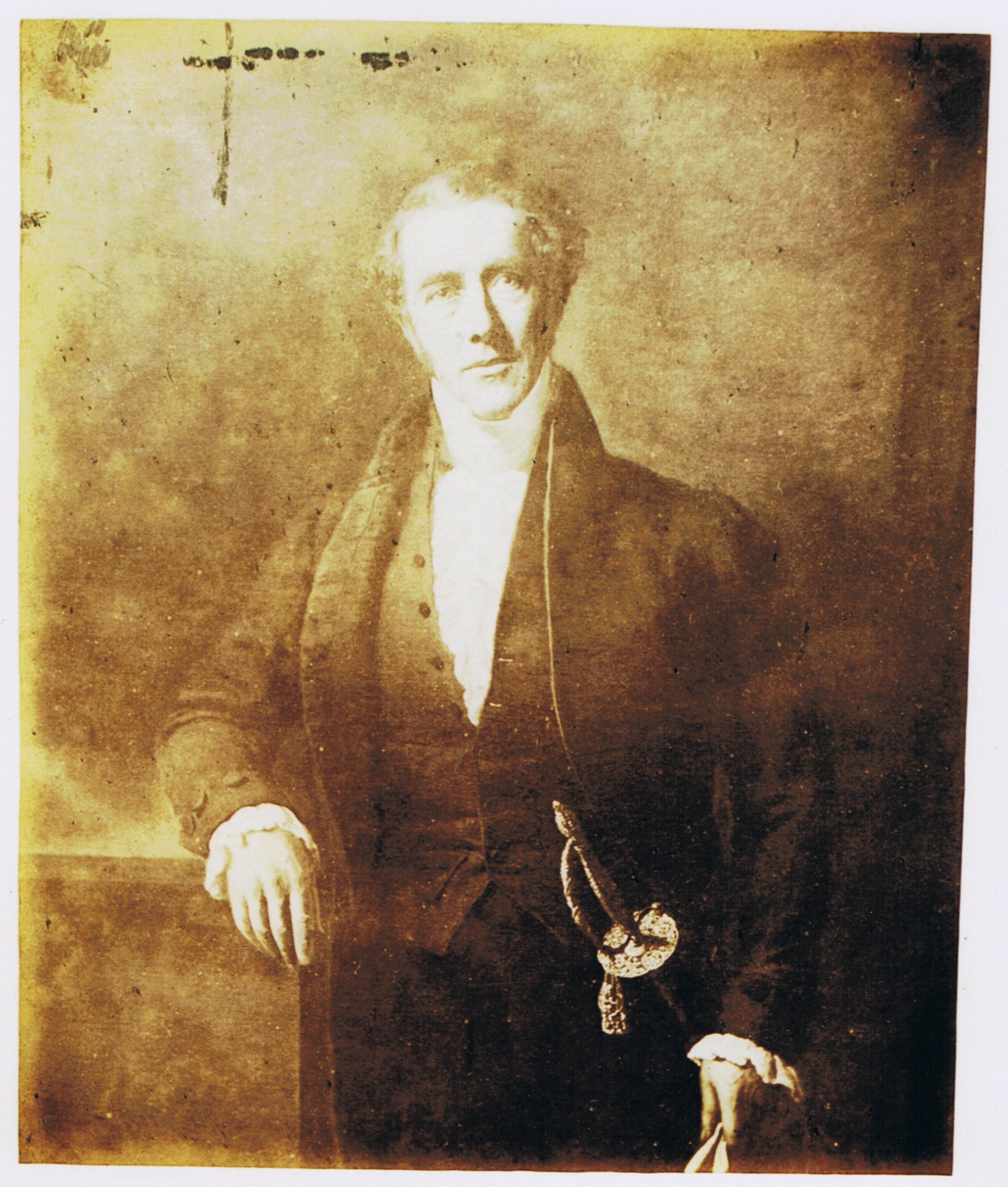
Photograph of the portrait of Colonel C. B. Challoner as Surrey's High Sheriff, 1838, by Spiridone Gambardella, circa 1838.

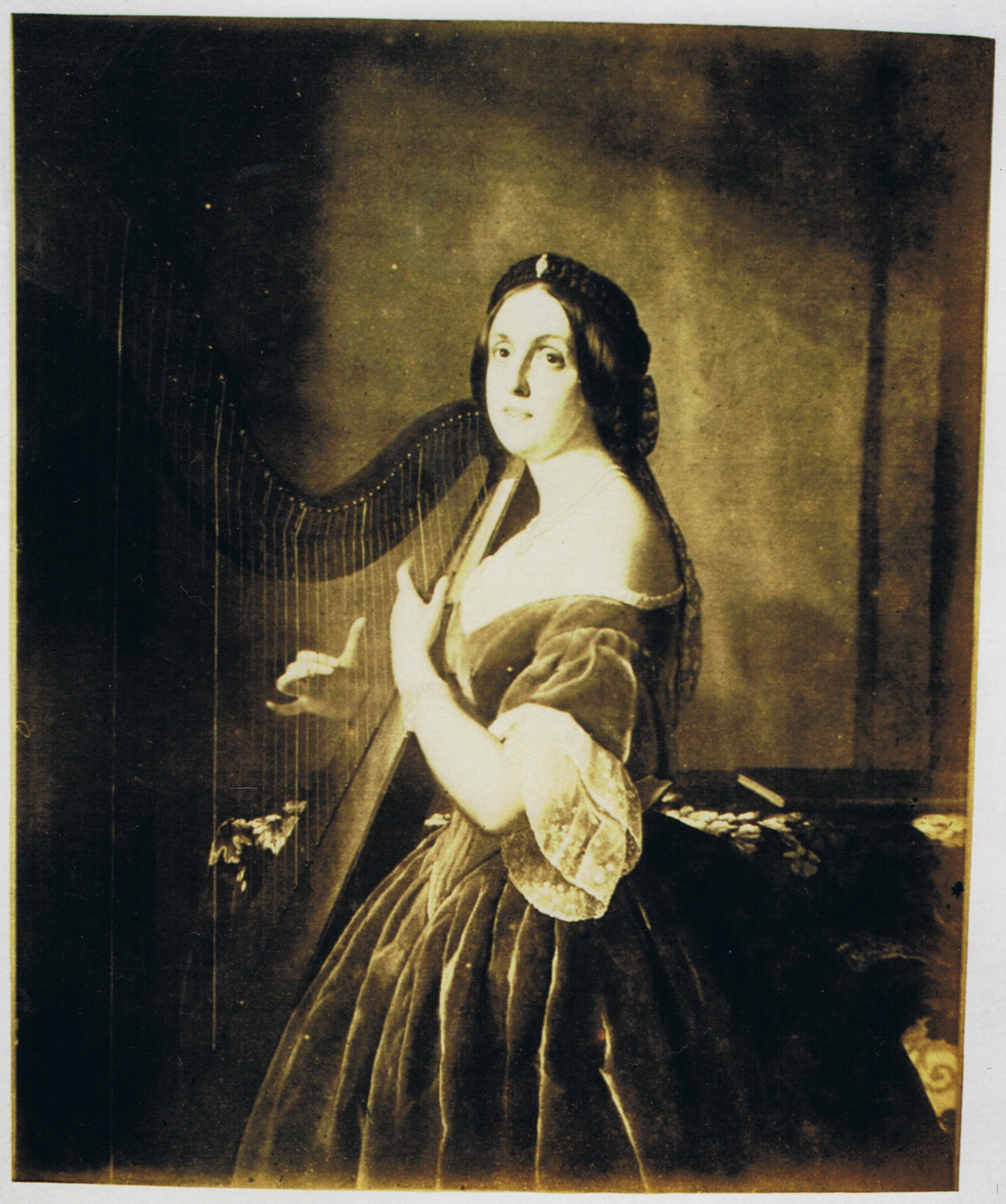
Photograph of a portrait of Henrietta Emma Helena, Mrs. Challoner, by Spiridone Gambardella, circa 1860.

He served as a lieutenant in the 1st Dragoon Guards (1809–1812). (Note: He served in the King's Dragoon Guards – Cornet: 9 March 1809; lieutenant: 1 August 1811.) On 26 March 1853 he was commissioned as Lieutenant-Colonel Commandant of the new 3rd Royal Surrey Militia, based in Kingston upon Thames. On his retirement from this command he was appointed the regiment's Honorary Colonel on 2 November 1867, a position he held until his death.

He was appointed a Justice of the Peace (J.P.) of Berkshire (1831) and of Surrey, and a Deputy Lieutenant (D.L.) for Surrey. He became High Sheriff of Surrey in 1838.

Challoner stood at the last minute in the Tory Red interest for Great Grimsby in the general election of 31 July 1830, he was unsuccessful coming fourth with 156 votes. The others were Charles Wood, with 227; George Harris, with 215; and George Fieschi Heneage, with 186. The Stamford Mercury of August 1830 said that Challoner promised to stand at the next election adding: 'The whole of the election has been most extraordinary ... and is it not the least strange that in spite of all the influence exercised by the other party ... Harris and Challoner, the popular candidates, should have mustered 371, the latter having 156 after a canvass of only 36 hours.'

He stood again in the 1852 general election for the West Surrey constituency but lost with 1385 votes to William Evelyn (with 1646 votes) and Henry Drummond (1610 votes) elected as Conservatives.

He was a member of the council and trustee of the Royal Agricultural Society of England from around 1839. He was chairman of the Finance Committee, Vice-chairman of the General Derby Committee, and wrote several papers which appeared in the society journal. Papers included, Practical instructions for improving and economically maintaining turnpike and parish roads upon the mile system, volume 2, 1841; Report on the Exhibition and Trial of Implements at the Exeter Meeting, volume 11, 1850; and On the Accurate Levelling of Drains, volume 11, 1850.

== Personal life ==
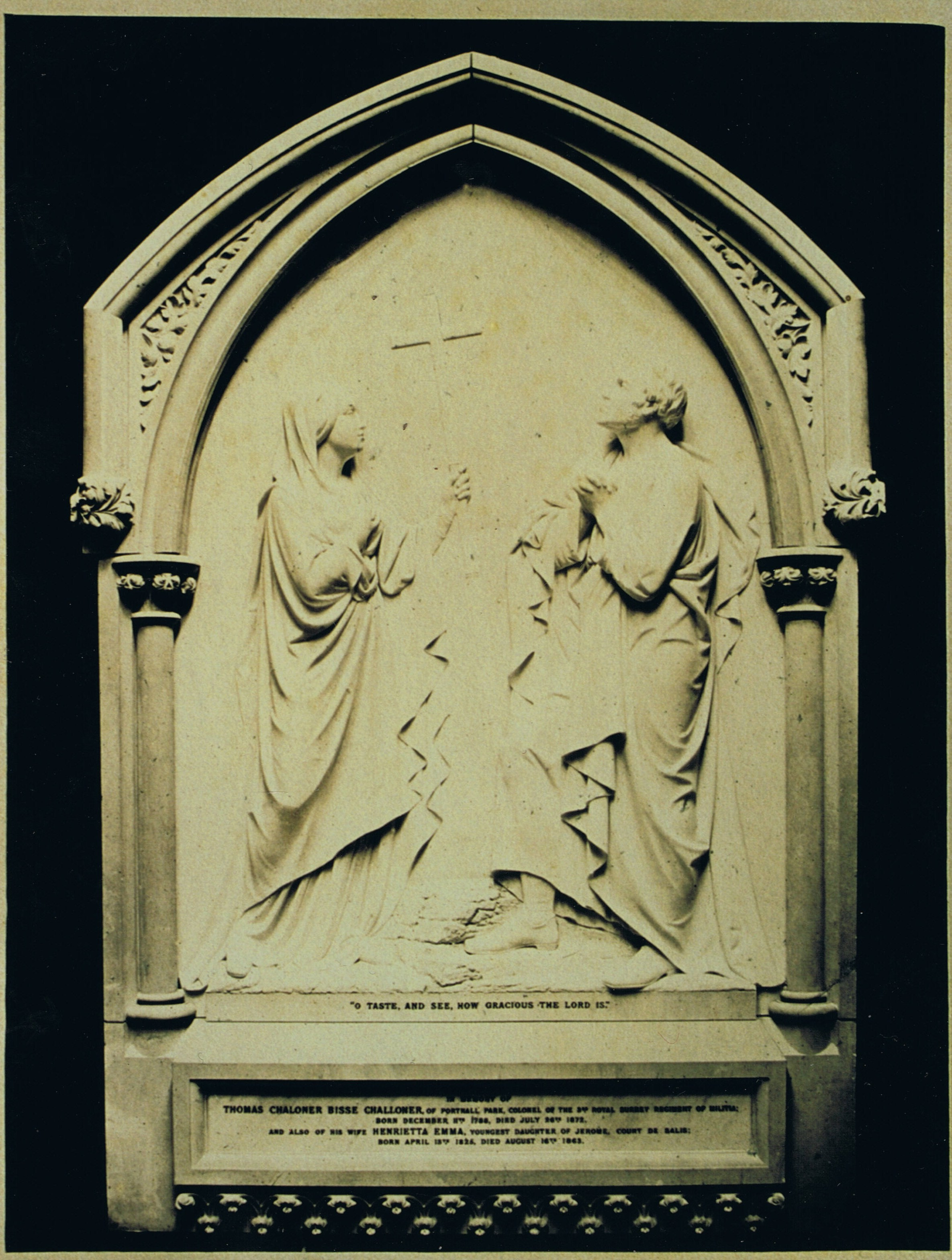
Memorial in Virginia Water's church to Challoner and his second wife, c1860s/70s.

He married, firstly, Anne, eldest daughter of Nicholas Loftus Tottenham, formerly an Irish Member of Parliament, in June 1812.

Lady Blessington circa 1822 when living at Palazzo Belvedere in Naples knew Chaloner Bisse, as he then was known, stating that: His hospitality and kindness made him deservedly respected by all. Presumably, this was mutual as he was described in Richard Robert Madden's 1855 biography in a chapter entitled 'Society of the Blessingtons at Naples' as 'among the English who frequented the villa'.

Madden (1798-1886) wrote: 'Among the English who frequented the Palazzo Belvidere [sic], the following may be enumerated as the elite, or most highly esteemed of the visitors there: Sir William Drummond, Sir William Gell, the Honorable Keppel Craven, Mr. William Hamilton, the British minister to the Neapolitan court; Colonel Chaloner Bisse, the Honorable R. Grosvenor, Captain Gordon, brother of Lord Aberdeen; Mr. Matthias, the author of 'the Pursuits of Literature;' Lord Guilford, Count (now Prince) Paul Lieven, Lord Ashley, Mr. Evelyn Denison, Mr. Richard Williams, Signor Salvaggi, a distinguished litterateur; the Duc de Rocco Romano, Marchesse Guiliano, Duc de Cazarano, Lord Dudley and Ward, Lord Howden, and his son Mr. Cradock; later, if I mistake not, Colonel Caradoc, the Honourable George Howard, the present Lord Morpeth, Mr. Millingen, the eminent antiquarian; Mr. Charles Matthews, the son of the celebrated comedian; Lord Ponsonby, Prince Ischitelli, Mr J. Strangways, the brother of Lord Ilchester; Mr H. Baillie, Mr. Herschel, the astronomer; Mr. Henry Fox (now Lord Holland), Mr J. Townsend (now Lord Sydney), Count de Camaldole, General Church, General Florestan Pepe, Mr. Richard Westmacott, the Duc de FitzJames, Casimir Delavigne, Filangiere (Prince Satriani), son of the well-known writer on jurisprudence; Mr. Bootle Wilbraham, Jun., the Abbe [Teodoro] Monticelli, an eminent geologist; the Archbishop of Tarento, Sir Andrew Barnard, Signor Piazzi, a celebrated astronomer, the discoverer of the planet Ceres.'

He married, secondly, on 6 January 1859, (Hadie) Henrietta Emma Helena De Salis (2 May 1824 – 16 August 1863), third surviving and youngest daughter of Jerome, 4th Count de Salis-Soglio.

Elizabeth Rigby, Lady Eastlake, in a letter to the mother of Effie Gray dated November 30, 1858 wrote: My dear Mrs Gray, Tell Effie that I have seen a little of dear Hadie. She is so happy in her engagement that I must not criticise it. Also I know that Col: C: is truly noble & liberal in all his sentiments & actions towards her, but he is not very attractive looking, & indeed I thought on first sight more of his plainness that of his years. However, she will make his remaining years very happy & will find her happiness in that.

== Notes ==
Honorary titles
Preceded by Thomas Alcock	High Sheriff of Surrey; 1838	Succeeded by Samuel Paynter
