= William Fane de Salis (businessman) =

British businessman, colonialist and barrister

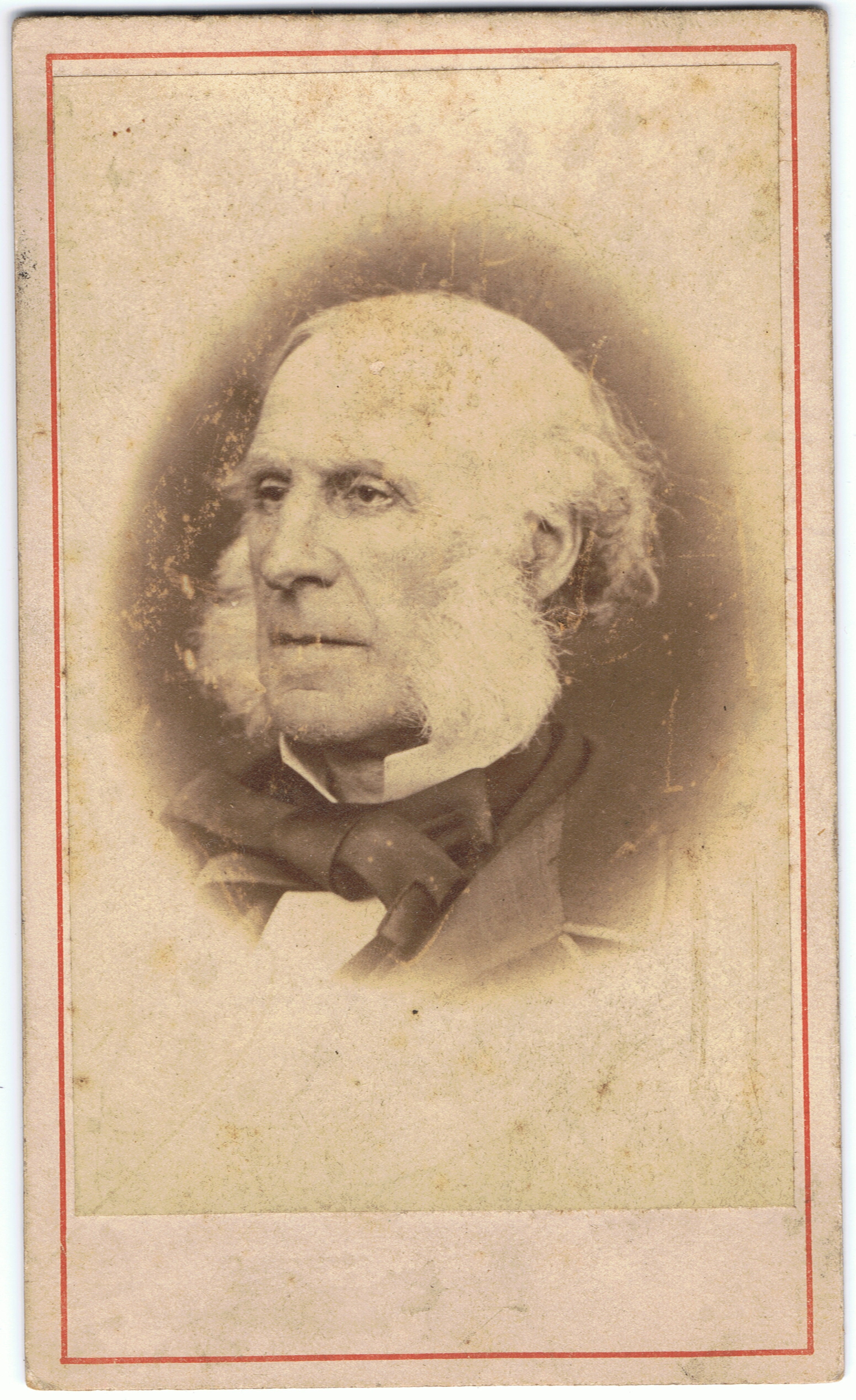
William de Salis

William Andreas Salius Fane de Salis (27 October 1812 – 3 August 1896) was a British businessman, colonialist, and barrister.

== Early life ==
De Salis was the third son of Jerome, 4th Count de Salis-Soglio (d. 1836), by his third wife, Henrietta Foster (d. 1856). Peter, 5th Count de Salis-Soglio was an elder half-brother; Rodolphus (a general) was an elder brother and Henry (a bishop) was his youngest brother.

Born in St. Marylebone, Westminster, and brought up in County Louth he was educated at Eton, Heidelberg University, and Oriel College, Oxford, where he took a fourth-class degree in classics. He was called to the Bar in 1836; and was at 3 Brick Court, Inner Temple, by 1840. He was appointed a revising barrister for Northamptonshire (1839), Nottingham and East Retford.

== Career ==
Fane de Salis visited Australia in 1842, 1844 and 1848 to pursue business opportunities in the Australian wool and other industries, then rapidly expanding. His younger brother Leopold Fabius Fane de Salis had migrated there in 1840. William became, with John Thacker, a partner in Thacker & Co, Jardine Matheson's affiliated house in Sydney, but resigned from 1 July 1847. By 1848 he owned with Robert Towns a 345-ton barque, the Statesman. This they sold, in March 1854, for $16,500, she having had an accident 'on her passage up to China from Sydney'.

On his return to England, de Salis joined the Grand Junction Canal Company in 1850 and held the following appointments:

- Directorship of the Union Bank of Australia;
- Director of the Australian Agricultural Company (AAco) and its offshoot the Peel River Land and Mineral Co Ltd;
- Director of The Marine and General Mutual Life Assurance Society;
- Director and later chairman of the P&O. He was a director between 1851–1895 and was elected chairman from 1878 until 1881;
- Deputy-chairman then chairman of the London Chartered Bank of Australia from 1852 to 1874/80.

== Personal life ==
In the early 1850s Fane de Salis lived between the Jerusalem Coffee House; Dawley Lodge (near Hillingdon); 1 Upper Belgrave Street; 24 Wilton Street, and 107 Eaton Square. From the late 1850s he lived at Dawley Court, near Hillingdon, and Harlington, Uxbridge, Middlesex and also at Teffont Manor, Teffont Evias, Wiltshire, the home of his wife Emily Harriet (d 24 July 1896), eldest daughter of John Thomas Mayne, whom he married on 12 March 1859.

Fane de Salis was a Fellow of the Geological Society and of the Royal Geographical Society, JP for Middlesex (1868), and JP for Wiltshire.

With J. D. Allcroft he co-founded the Harlington, Harmondsworth and Cranford Cottage Hospital in 1884. He left Dawley Court to his youngest brother's second son, Cecil Fane De Salis. His wife Emily had died only ten days earlier.

== Works ==
- Reminiscences of Travel in China and India in 1848 (1892; private circulation)
- Introductory Remarks to a Residence in Australia, And To Travels in China And India (a short pamphlet)
- Original Poems with Translations from the German of Schiller (private circulation)

== Gallery ==
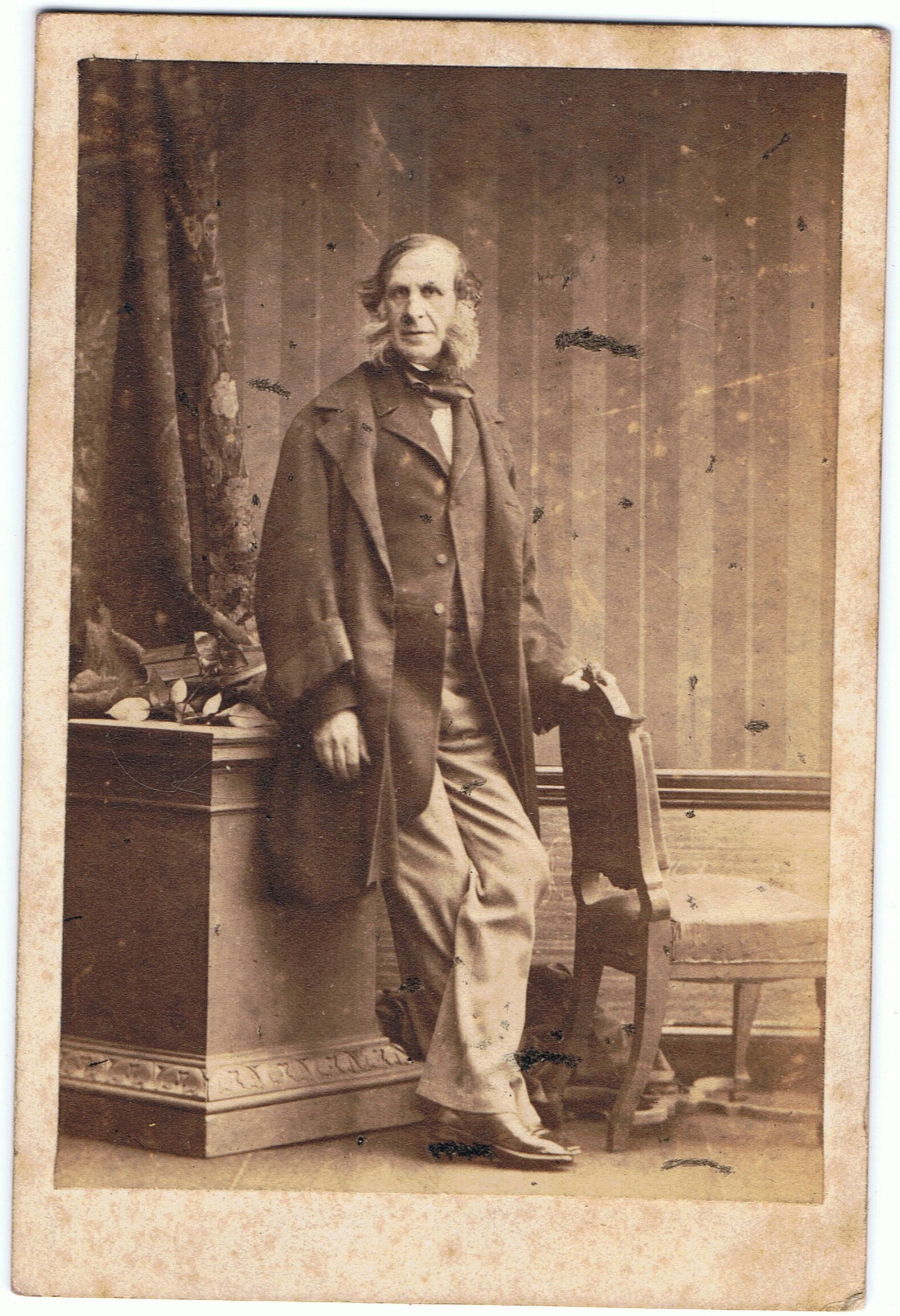
In 1861, aged about 48

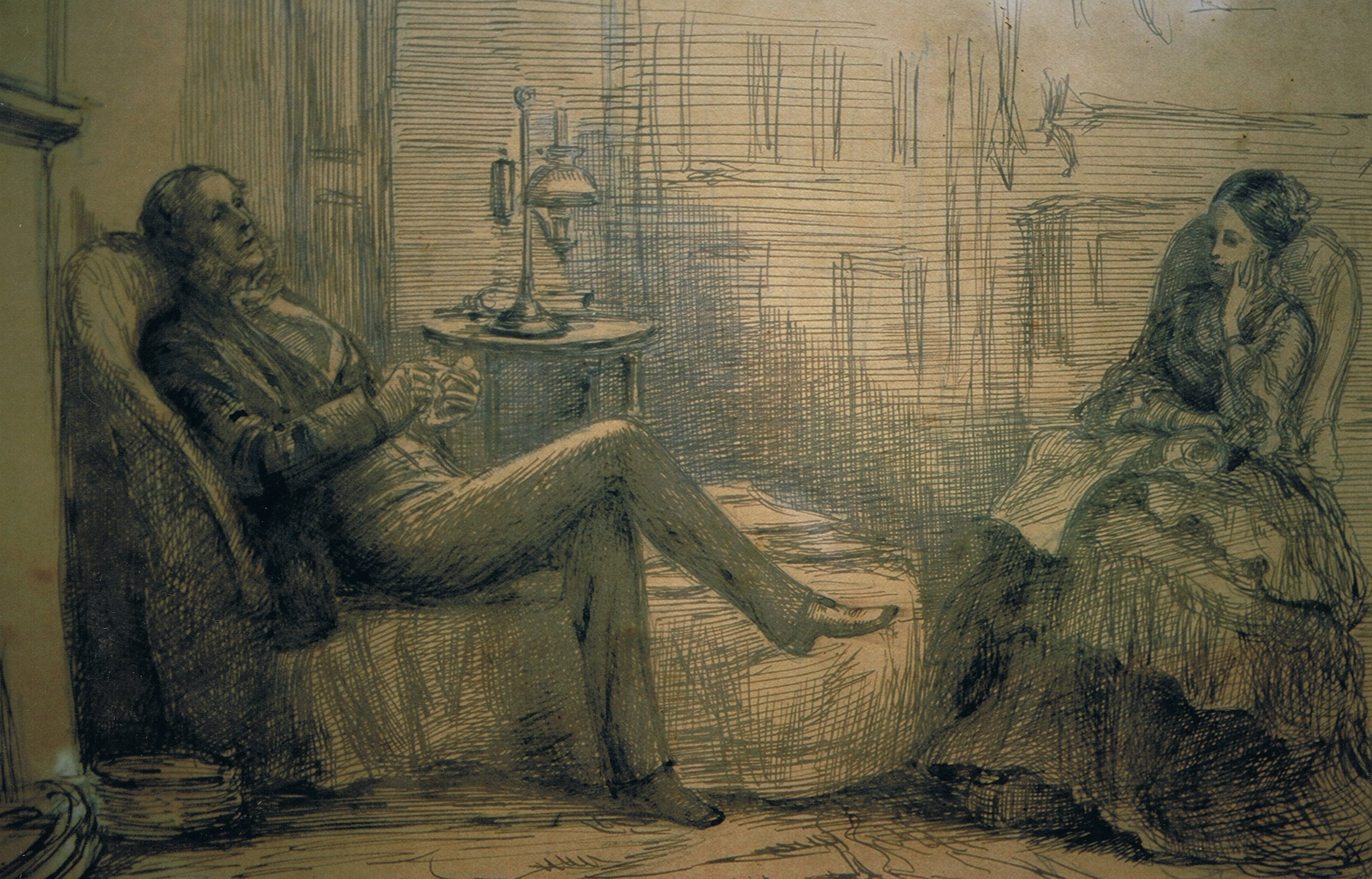
With his wife

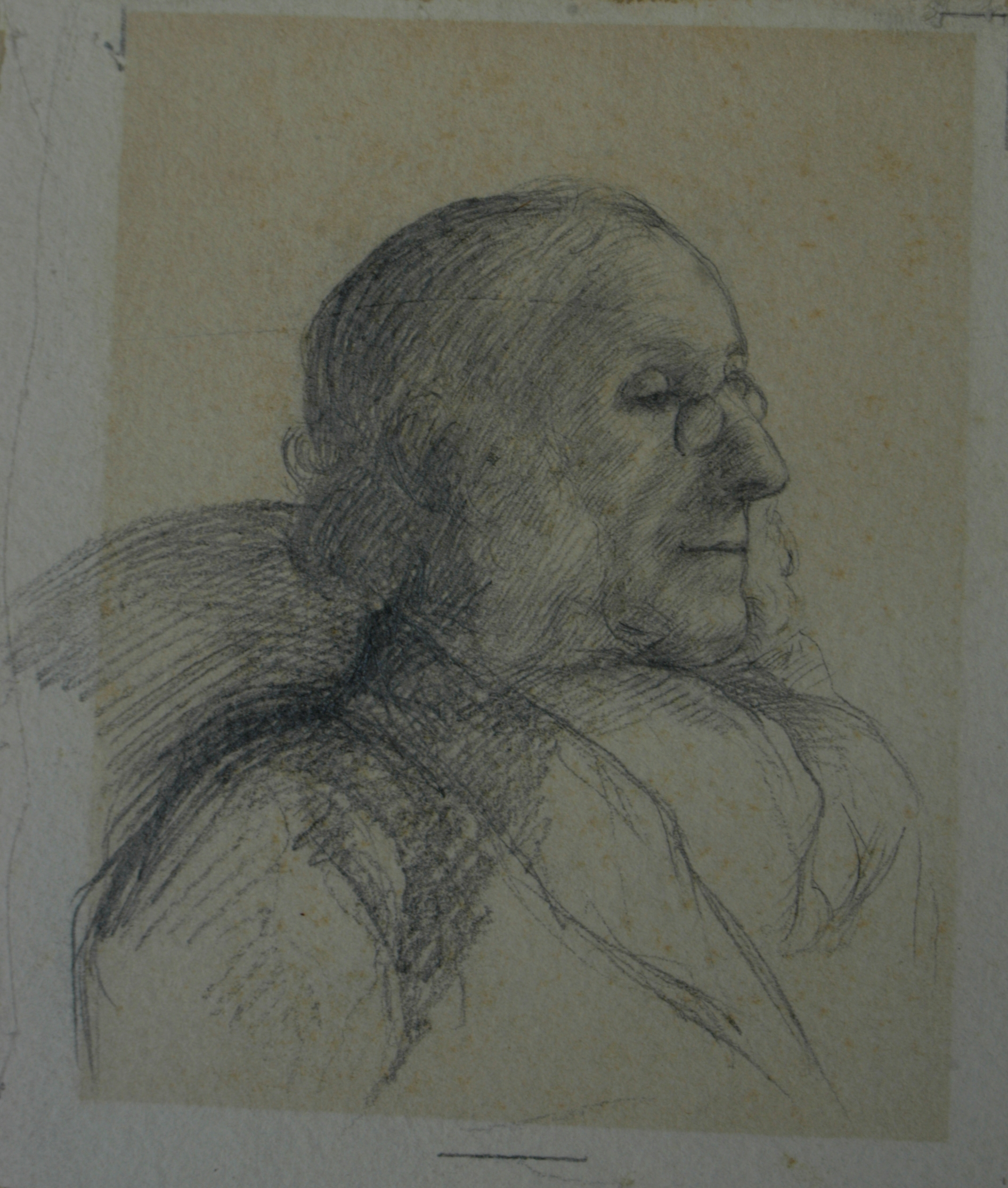
Pencil sketch

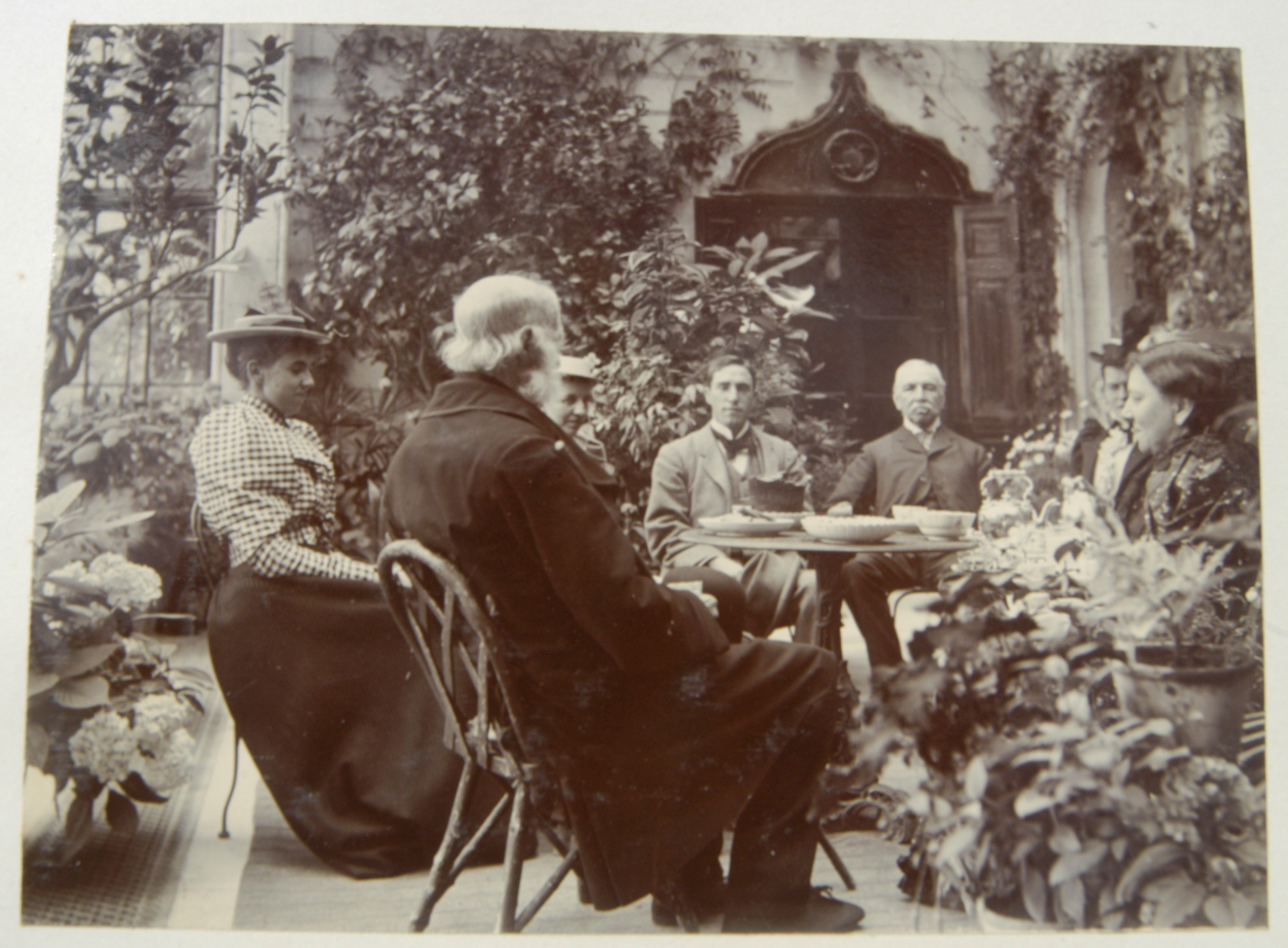
Tea at Teffont Evias

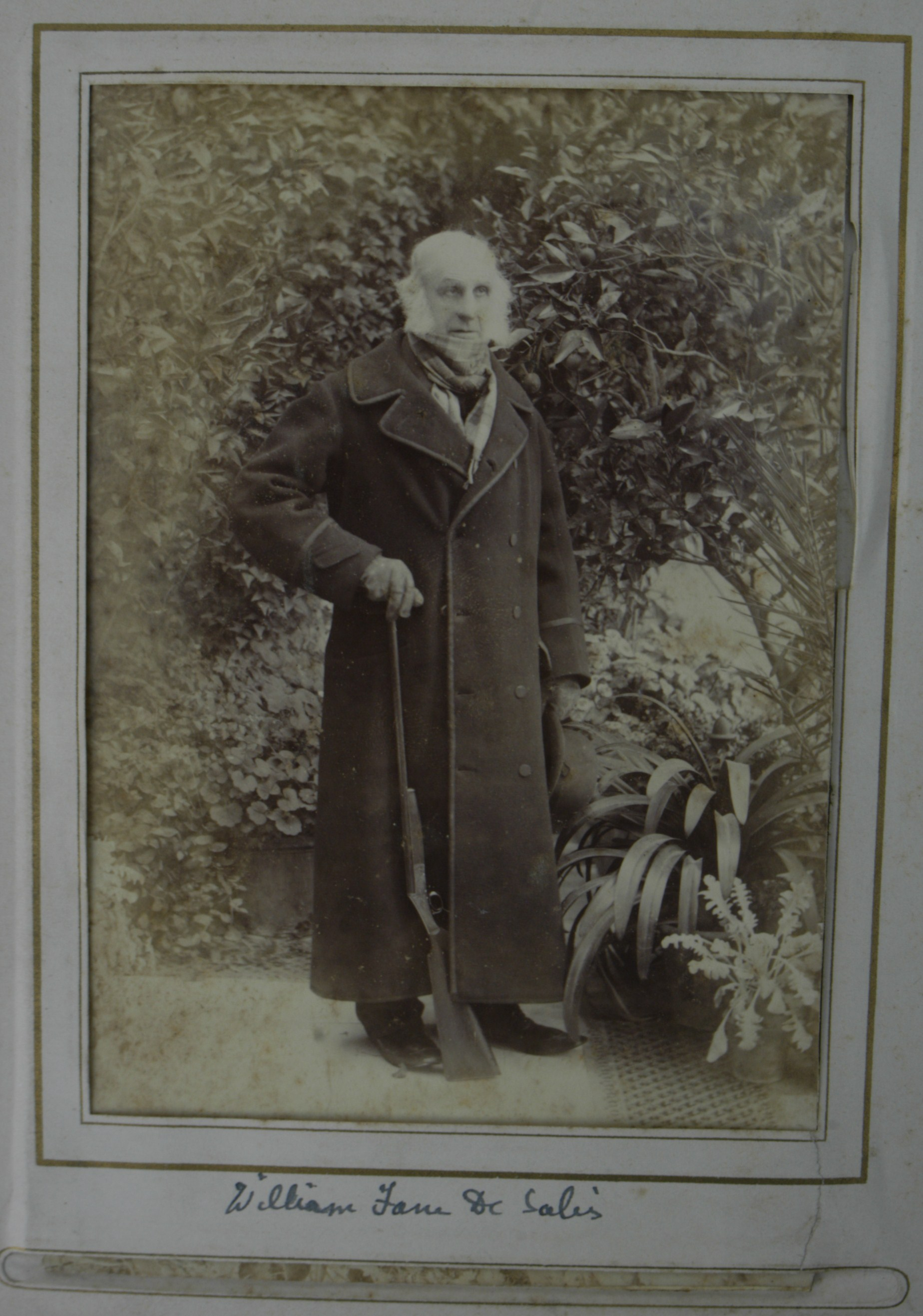
With shotgun

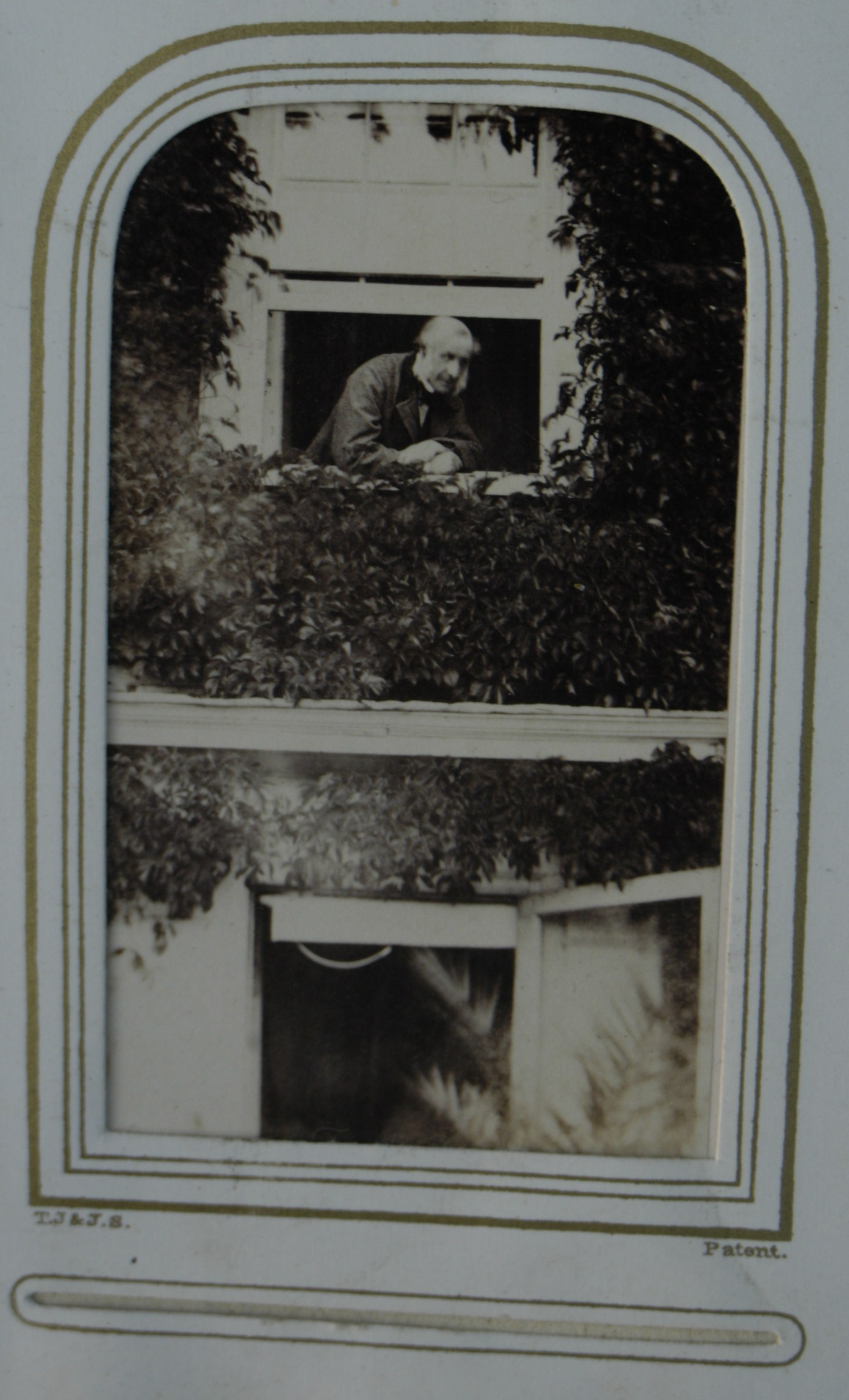
At Dawley Court
