= Portnall Park, Virginia Water =

Manor house in Virginia Water, Surrey, England

Coordinates: 51°23′50.0″N 0°35′54.4″W

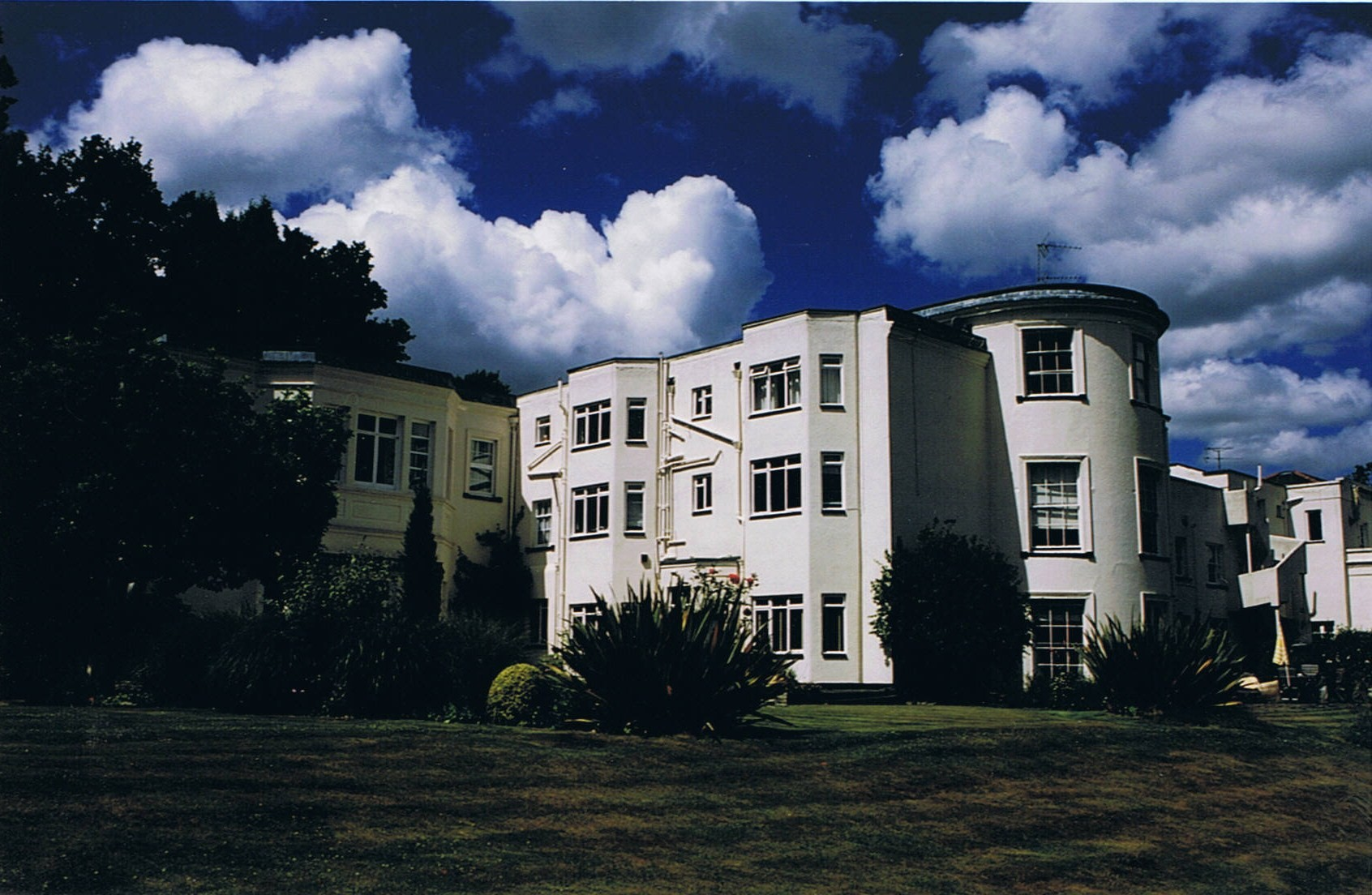
Portnall Park/Dormy House in 2008. Close up of the south east front.

Portnall Park is a manor house in Virginia Water, Surrey, on Bagshot road, three miles (5 km) from Egham, and 21 miles from London.

== History ==
A house was built at Potnalls, Potenall, Portenall, or Portnall Park by c. 1770. In 1804 Rev. Thomas Bisse (c1754-1828) exchanged it for some land at Tite Hill, Egham (probably land that had belonged to his wife's aunt Lydia Challoner (died 1803) with David Jebb, the younger son of Dr. John Jebb, Dean of Cashel (c1706-1787), and elder brother of John Jebb (reformer).

Bisse extended the mansion, as did the son, Colonel Bisse-Challoner (1788–1872), after 1828.

This is how Prosser described it in 1828: 'The park, comprising nearly four hundred acres, is beautifully undulated, and diversified with timber and flourishing plantations, through which extensive gravel walks and green rides are formed; in well-chosen situations are seats and rustic retreats, commanding extensive and beautifully varied views over the Surrey hills on the one side, and over the far-famed lake of Virginia Water on the other.

The entrance lodge is built in a peculiarly elegant style, and the approach to the house is about three quarters of a mile through some thriving plantations. The gardens and farm to the south-west of the house are lately erected on a very convenient and elegant plan.'

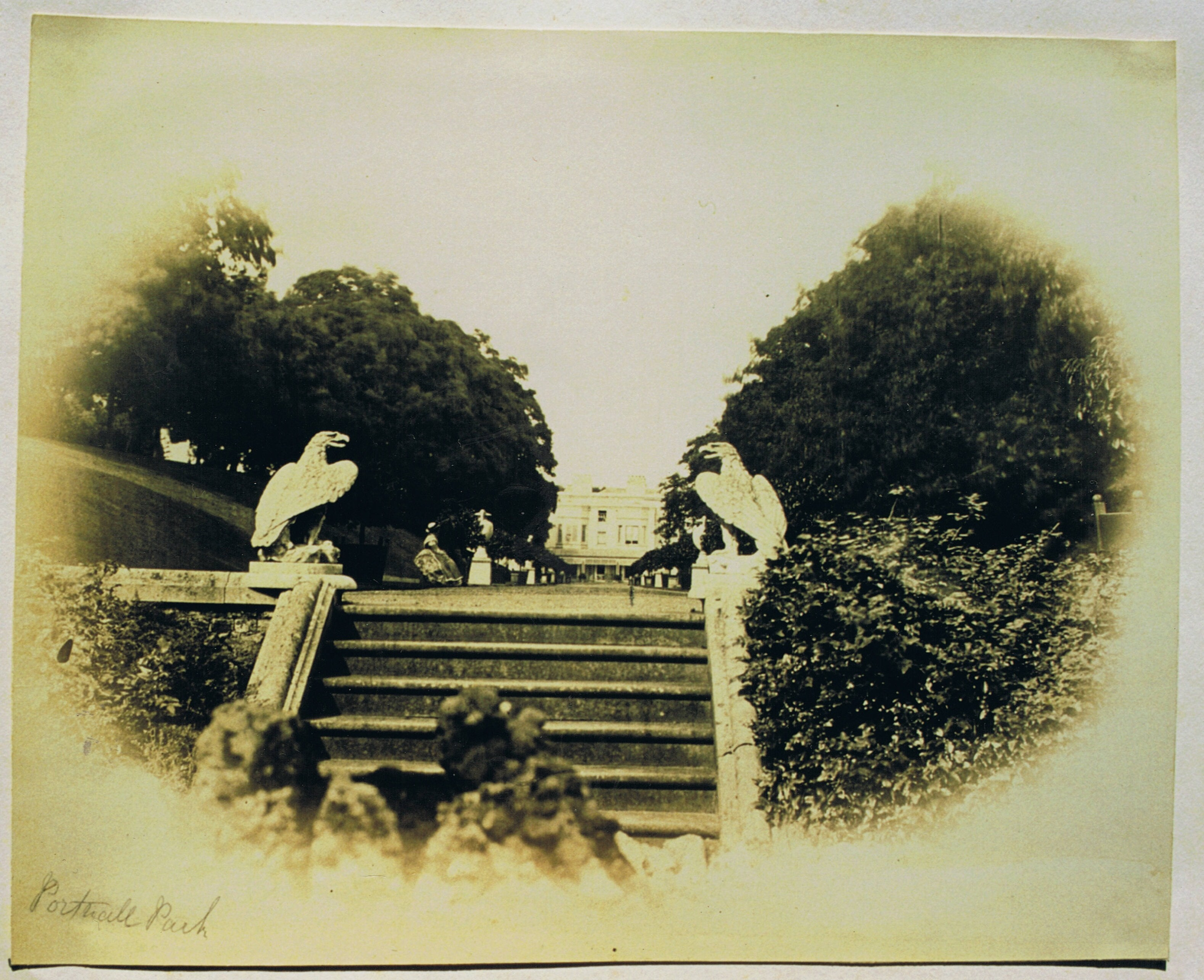
Photo of a terrace, looking northish towards the house, c1870. From an album belonging to Rev. Henry Jerome's brother Willy and his wife Emily.

Col. Challoner married, secondly, on 6 January 1859, Henrietta Emma Helena De Salis (1824–1863) third surviving daughter of Count de Salis. In 1872 Col. Challoner died, and his estate passed to his second wife's youngest brother, Rev. Henry Jerome de Salis (d.1915). According to Henry Jerome's second son Cecil in 1872 Portnall was staffed by three men in the house; two in the stables; six or seven men in the garden; nine or 10 maids in the house; and four or five men on the farm [which was c600 acres].

On his death, the life interest passed to Henry Jerome's eldest son, Rodolph (died 1931) (the youngest son was Charles Fane de Salis). He soon had the house on the market and after a brief struggle with his next brother it was eventually alienated and sold in 1923 to golf course pioneer and property developer W.G. Tarrant now of Wentworth Estate fame, for £15,000.

The freehold comprised 196 acres (0.79 km^{2}) with a 2,400-foot (730 m) [nearly half a mile] frontage to the main road. The mansion house had 27 or 30 bedrooms and dressing rooms. There was a 'large square block of stabling' (for 15 horses); a six booth coach house; barn; cowsheds; bailiff's cottage; bothy; potting sheds; 'good' greenhouses; two walled gardens; five pairs of freehold cottages (three at Shrubs Hill and two at Knowle Hill); two lodge cottages; and a gardener's cottage.

In an Affidavit sworn 23 January 1923 in the High Court of Justice Chancery Division before Mr. Justice Eve, re. Challoner's Settled Estate, Rodolph wrote:

'As regards paragraph eight, my view is that having regard to the proposed developments, there will shortly be little to choose between Dawley and Portnall in respect of destroyed amenities'.

Comparison in 2008 of the fate of the land around Dawley, Middlesex, just south of Hillingdon towards Heathrow, with the present state of the Wentworth Estate would show that to have been a miscalculation. (Dawley was a small estate that his brother had inherited and had seemingly proposed to sell off in order to keep Portnall).

== George Prosser's description of 1828 ==
THE SEAT OF COLONEL BISSE CHALLONER

Portenhall,- or Portnall park, formerly belonged to the crown. In an act of parliament passed in the first year of the reign of Henry the Seventh, 1485, for resumption of all grants since the thirty-fourth of Henry the Sixth, is an exception of several made by that king; amongst which is one to Richard Pigot of the keepership of Potenhall park. In 1528 Henry the Eighth granted to Sir William Fitz-William, his park of Portnall, paying annually a red rose to the sheriff of Surrey. It is a manor within a manor, having the right and privilege of appointing a keeper. It became the property of Dean Jebb, and from him descended to his son David Jebb, esq. who sold it about the year 1795 to the Rev. Bisse. Mr. Bisse shortly afterwards pulled down the remaining wing of the ancient mansion, which had fallen into decay, and built a modern house on the same site. On the death of Mr. Bisse in 1828, the property devolved to his son Colonel Bisse Challoner, who has from his own plans effected a total change in the character of the estate, a great portion of which had been inclosed from the neighbouring heath. Extensive plantations of firs, &c. made by the present owner during his father's lifetime have materially aided in the formation of the many delightful scenes this spot now presents.

The house has also been much improved and enlarged. The interior, though not very spacious, is replete with comfort and convenience, and is enriched with many works of art, among which are some splendid agate tables and marble vases of a superior order, which die present owner brought with him from Italy. On the west side have been added excellent and commodious brick-built offices. Near the house are some avenues of very stately old oak : through one of these avenues before the south-west front, a handsome gravel terrace walk, thirty feet wide by four hundred feet long, has been formed. It is ornamented with marble seats and statues on either side, after the manner of the Stahan gardens, and commands a beautiful prospect. In the vale below two sheets of water recently formed contribute much to the effect of the local scenery. The park, comprising nearly four hundred acres, is beautifully undulated, and diversified with timber and flourishing plantations, through which extensive gravel walks and green rides are formed; in well-chosen situations are seats and rustic retreats, commanding extensive and beautifully varied views over the Surrey hills on the one side, and over the far-famed lake of Virginia Water on the other. The entrance lodge is built in a peculiarly elegant style, and the approach to the house is about three quarters of a mile through some thriving plantations. The gardens and farm to the south-west of the house are lately erected on a very convenient and elegant plan. Portnall park is on the Bagshot road, three miles distant from Egham, and twenty-one from London.

== Gallery ==
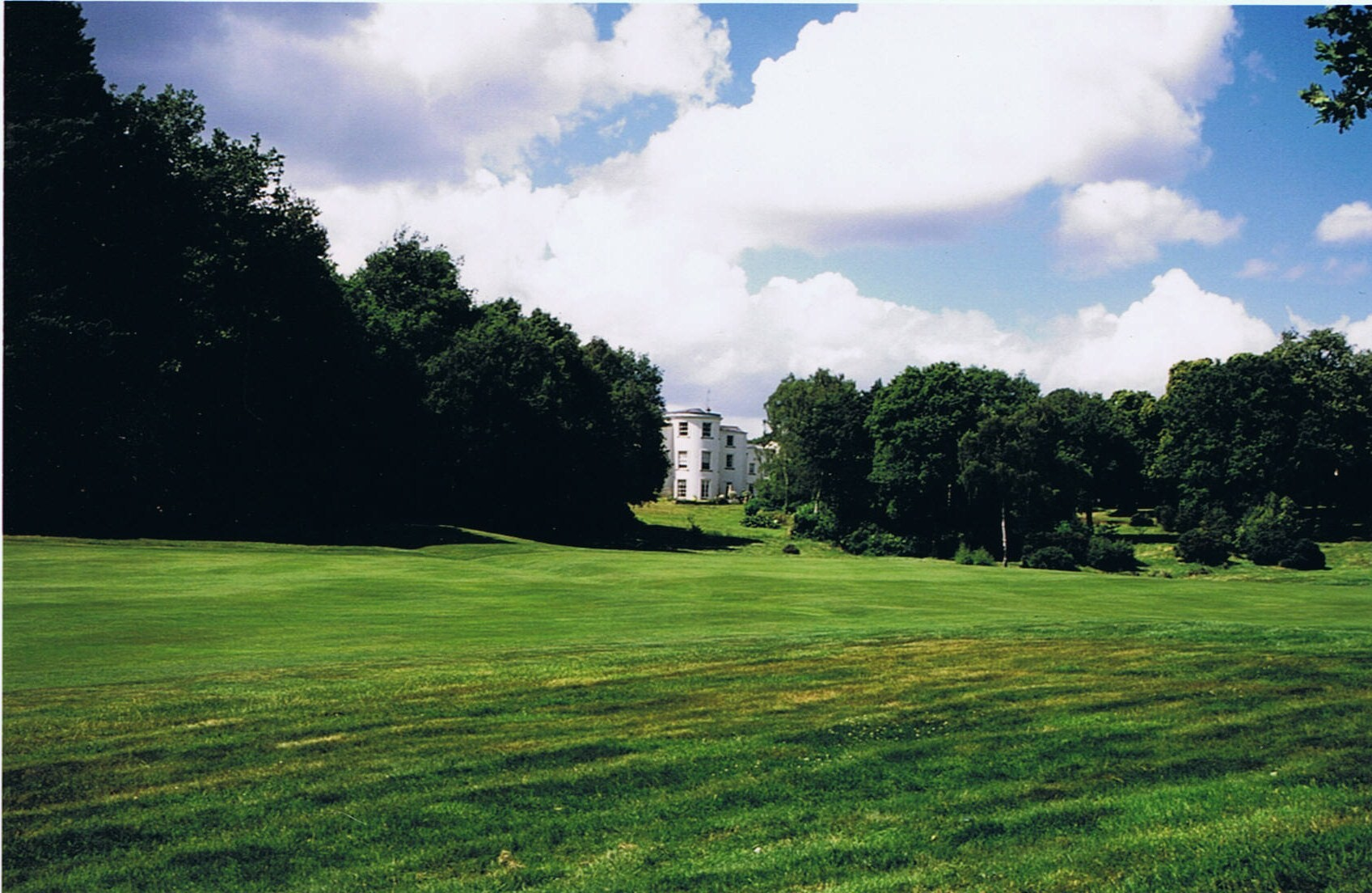
Portnall Park, aka The Dormy House, in 2008.

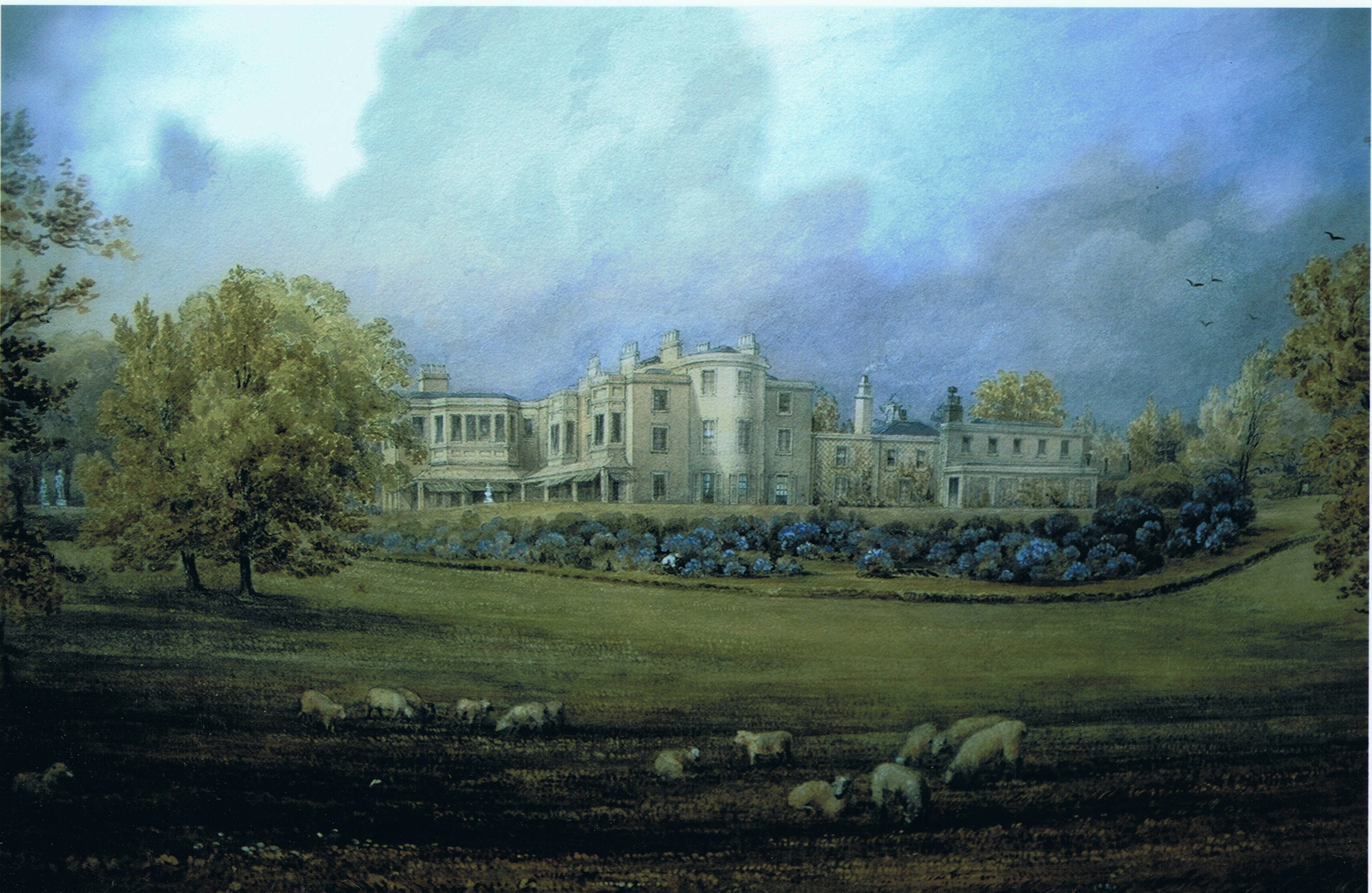
Portnall Park, circa 1859. From a water-colour, a view from the south-east.

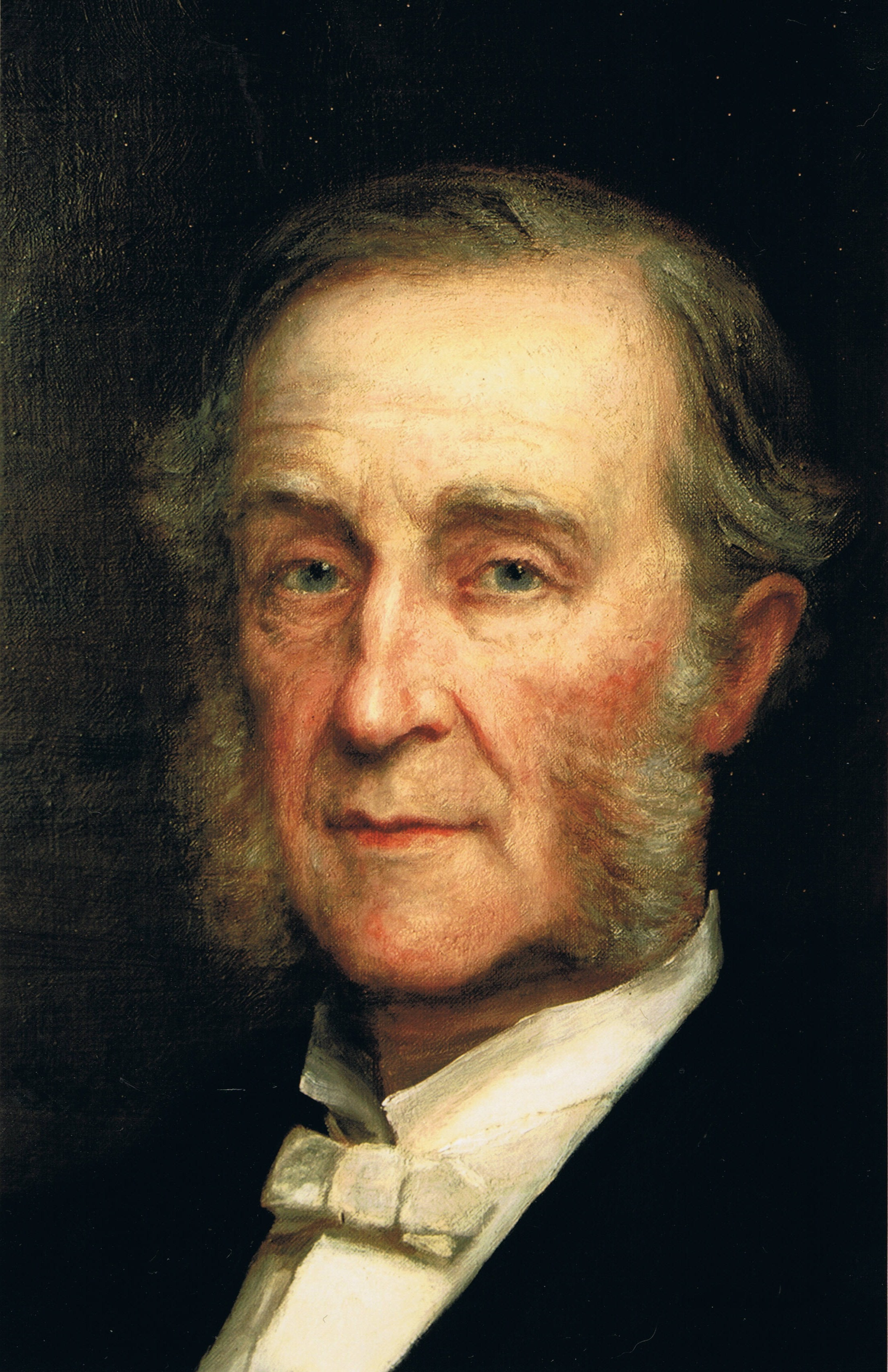
Rev. Henry Jerome Fane De Salis (died 1915), Portnall's life-tenant from 1872 to 1915.

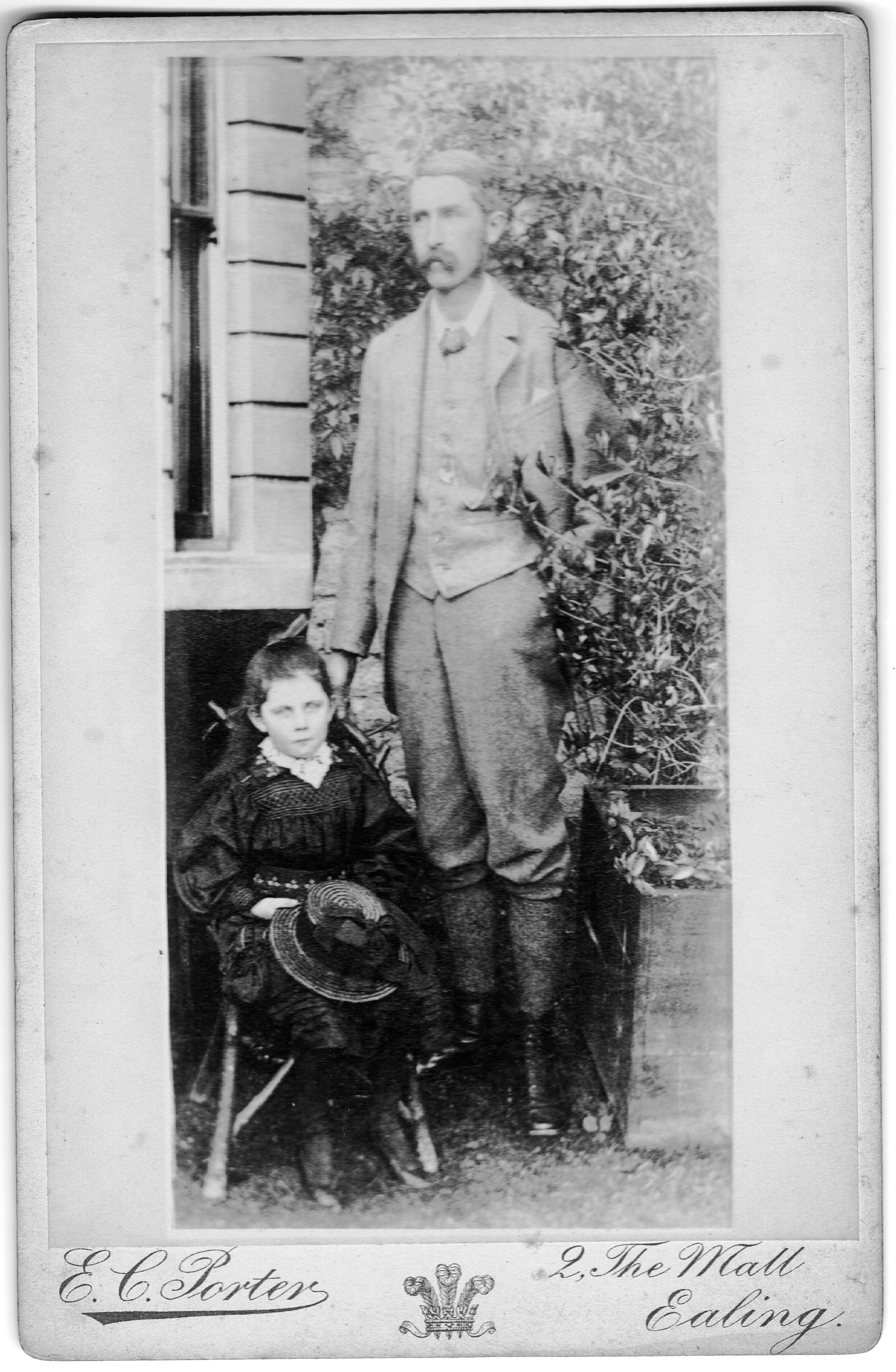
Rodolph Fane De Salis (d.1931) (and his only child, Margery (d.1932)). Life-tenant from 1915 to 1923, when he broke the entail and sold it.

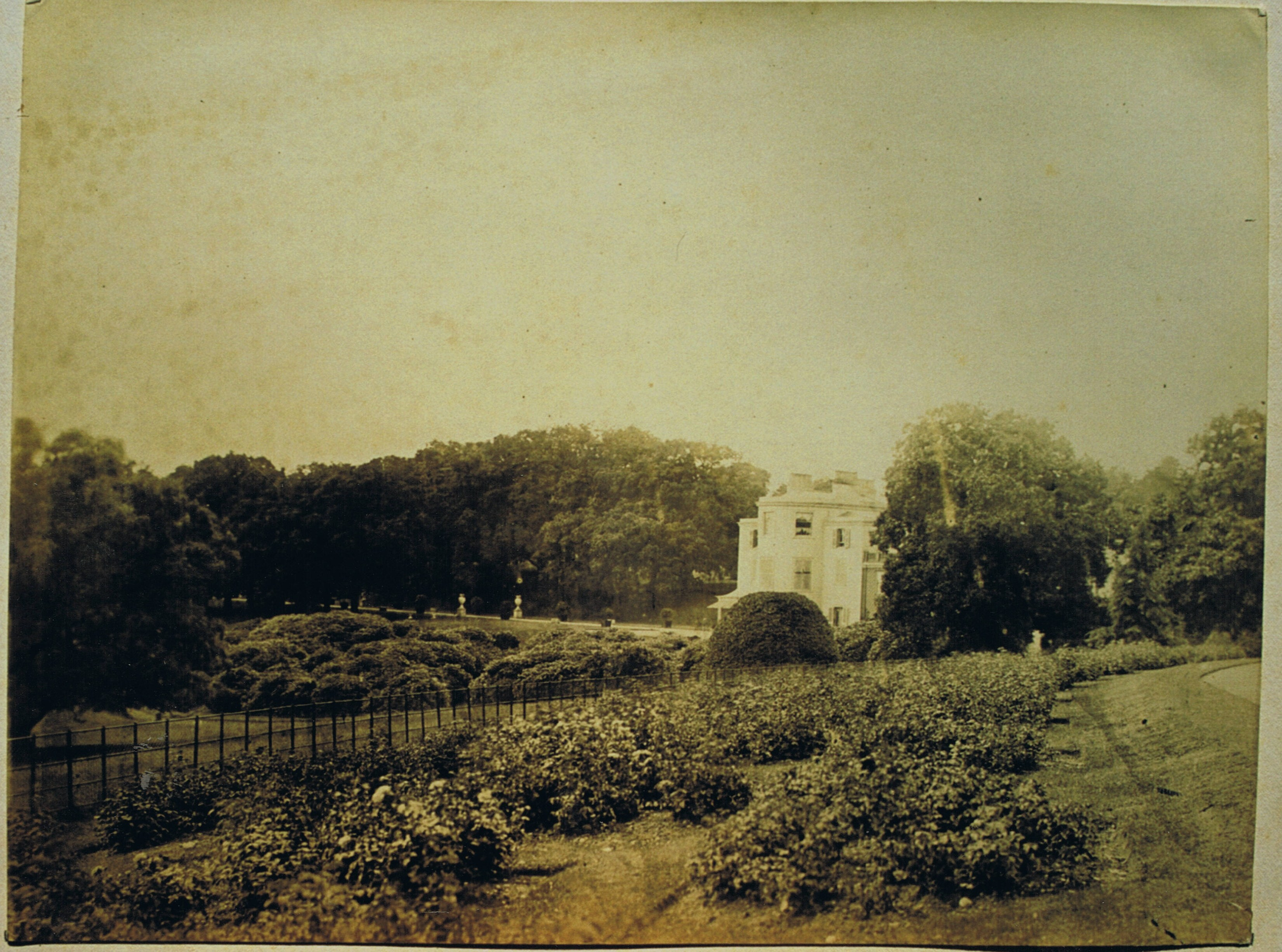
Portnall, c.1865. From the north.

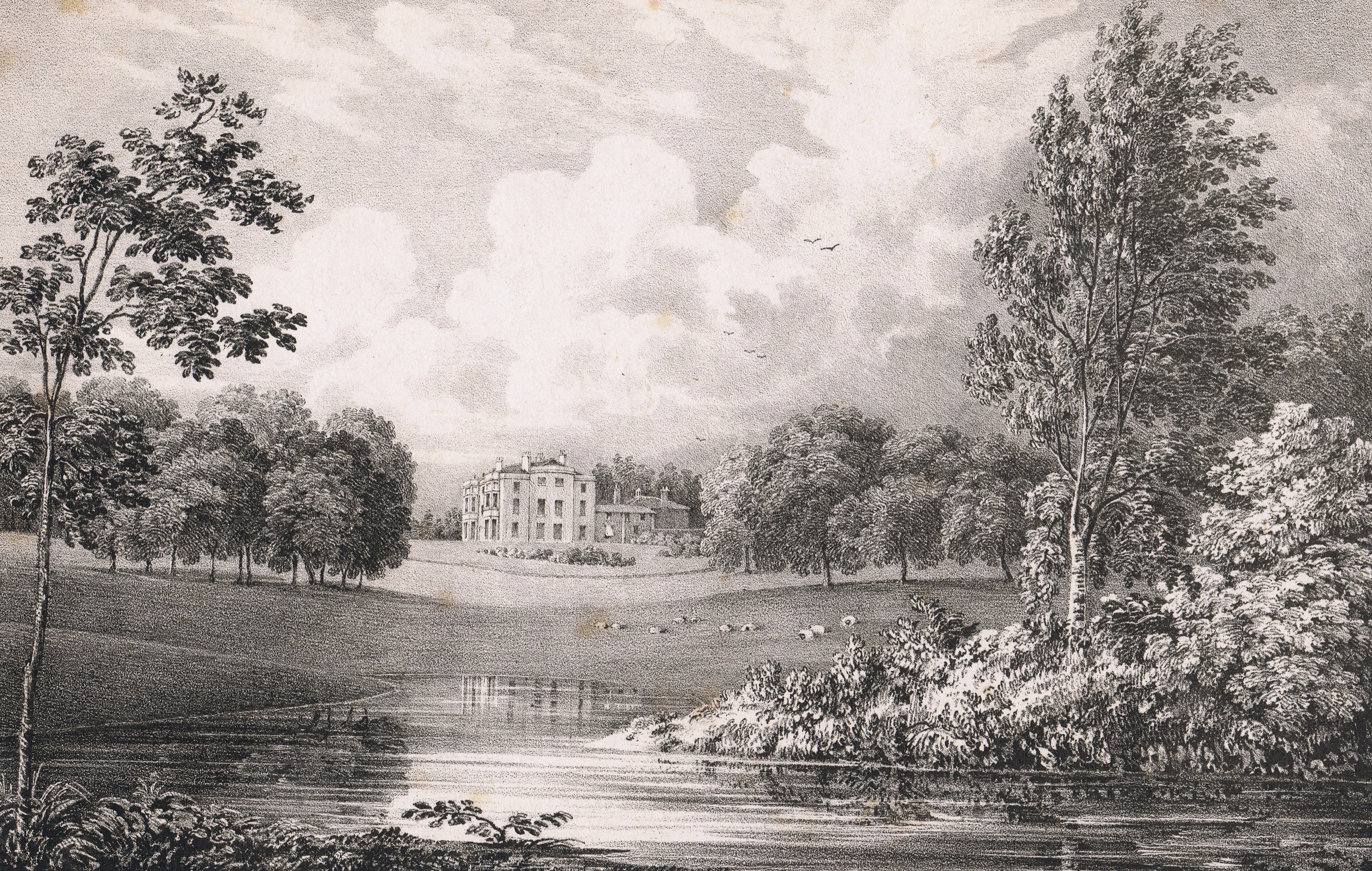
Portnall Park in 1828, by G.F. Prosser.

== External links and other sources ==
- R. de Salis, Beneficiary Bisse : Colonel Thomas-Chaloner Bisse-Challoner, heir and his heirs. Smith, Stebbing, Aynscombe, Wight, Bisse, Chew and Challoner & de Salis, c1680-1947, London, 2008.
- Select Illustrations of the County of Surrey: Comprising picturesque Views of the Seats of the Nobility and Gentry. Interesting remains, and with Descriptions ... , by George Frederick Prosser, and published by Rivington, London, 1828.
- Victoria County History (VCH), A History of the County of Surrey: Volume 3, H.E. Malden (ed), 1911.
- Rachel & Cecil De Salis, Notes of Past days, Henley-on-Thames, 1939.
- Portrait of Rodolph de Salis by George Spencer Watson in the Waterways Museum in Gloucester. (The BBC caption is misleading, he was not 'Henry Rudolf', Henry Rodolph was a cousin.)
- A brief history of Wentworth estate, Virginia Water, 29 June 2002.
