= Cecil Fane De Salis =

Sir Cecil Fane de Salis, KCB, DL, JP, (31 May 1857 – 9 March 1948) was chairman of Middlesex County Council 1919–1924, and landowner in the parish of Harlington.

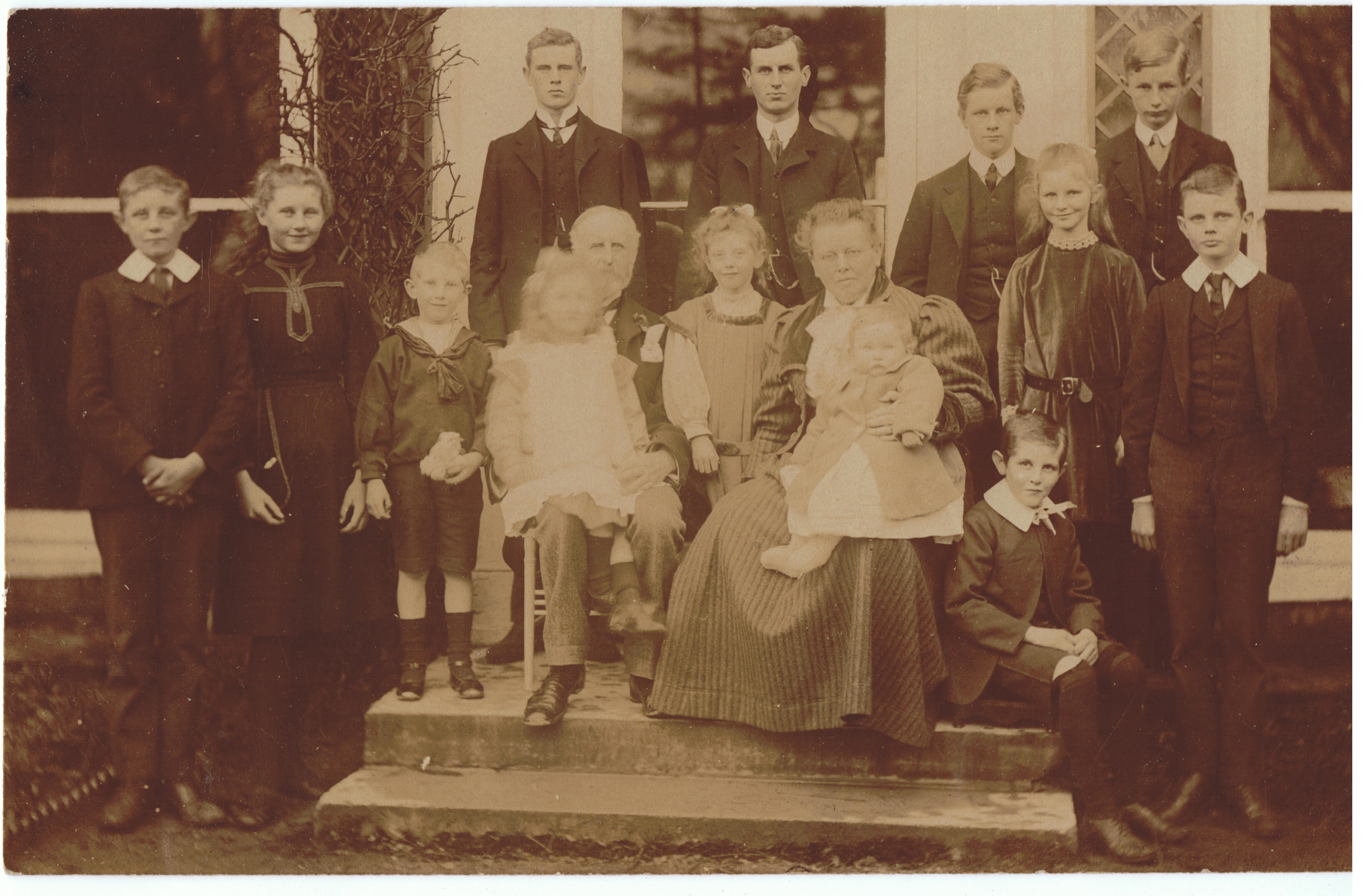
Postcard of Cecil Fane de Salis, and his wife and 13 children, 1912.

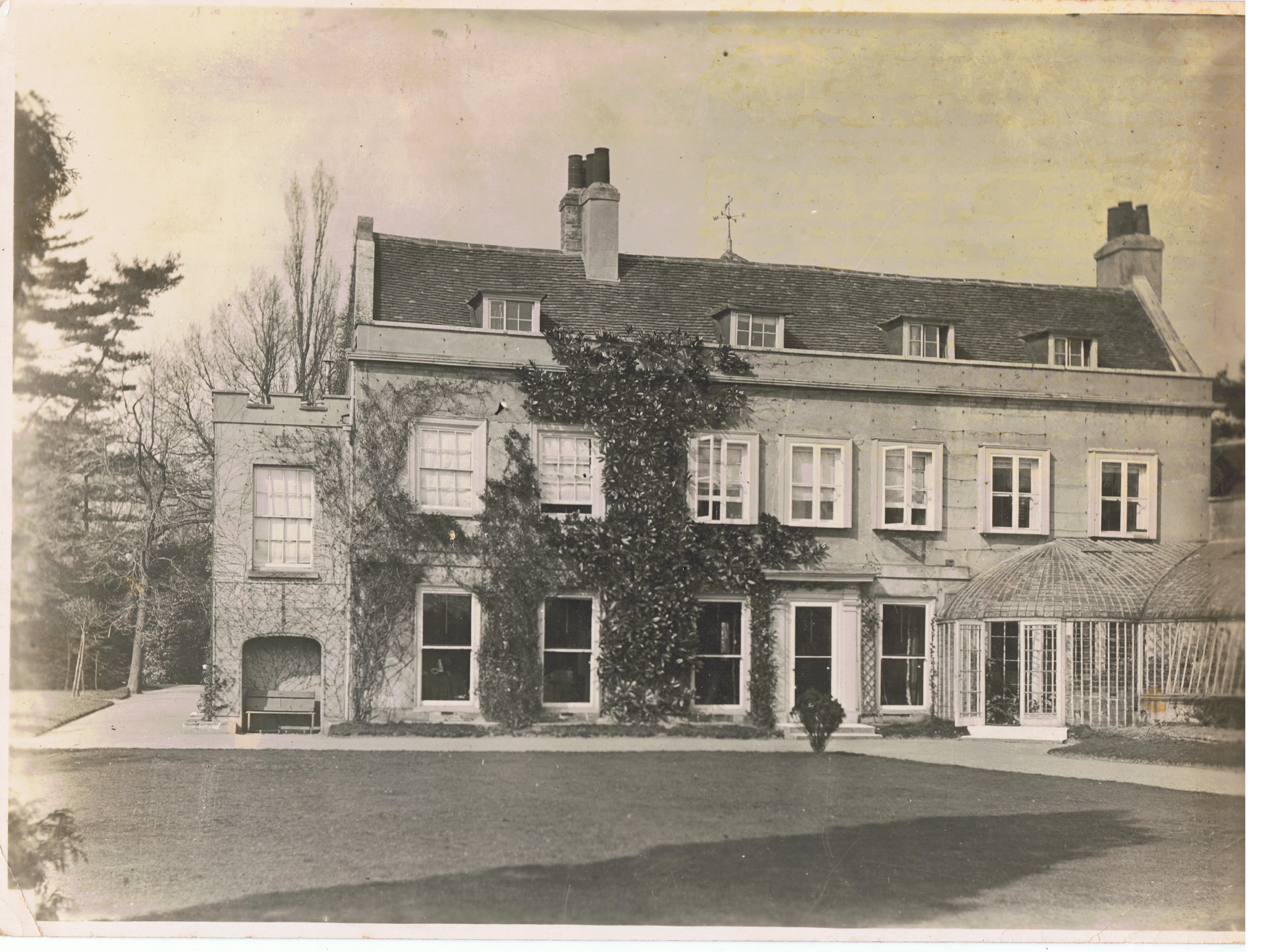
Dawley Court, Goulds Green, on the border of Harlington and Hillingdon, Middlesex, c. 1890.

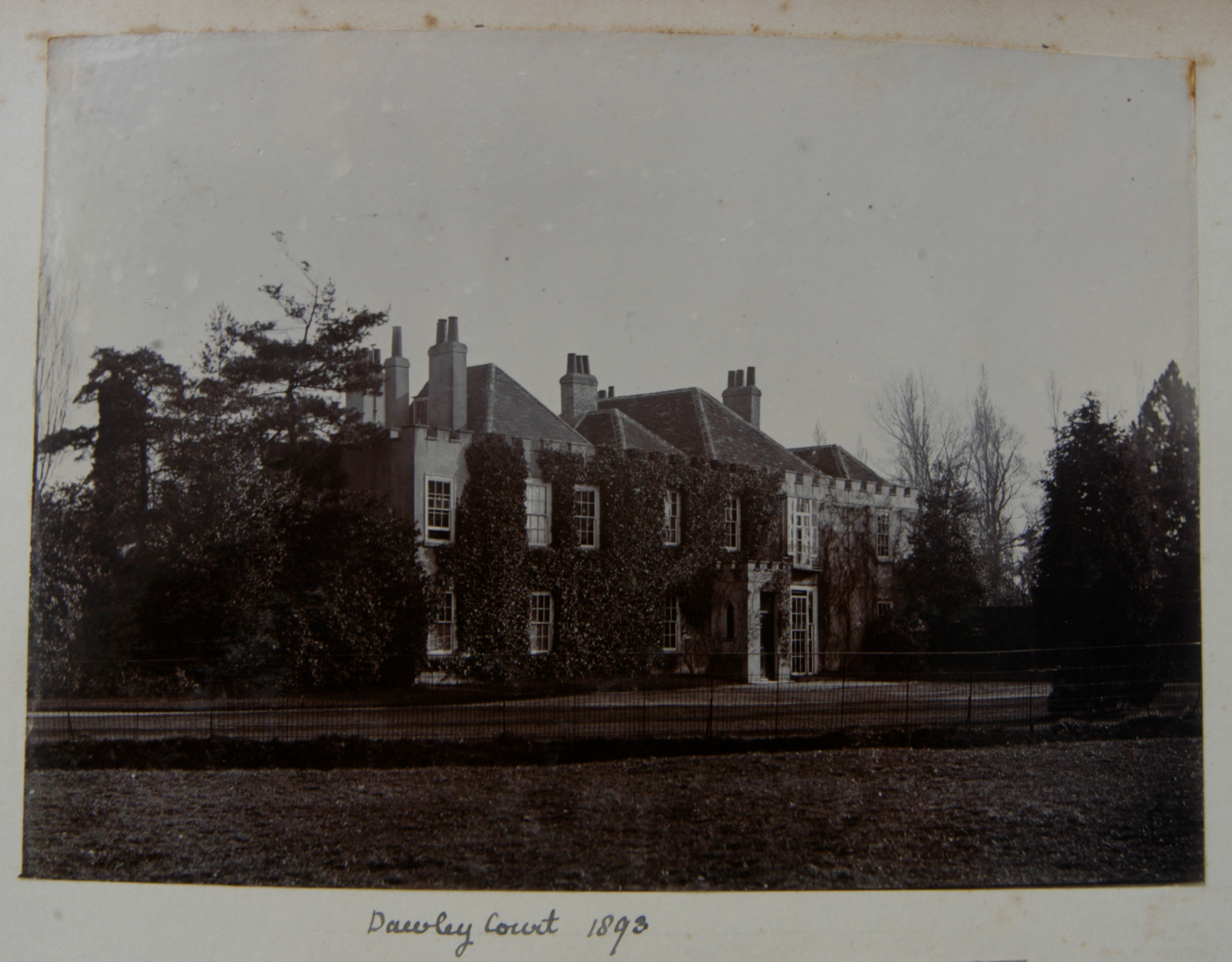
Photograph of Dawley Court in 1893.

== Biography ==
Second of four sons of Rev. Henry Jerome Fane De Salis of Portnall Park, he was educated at Eton and Christ Church, Oxford. He was called to the Bar from the Inner Temple in 1881.

In March 1899 he was elected unopposed to Middlesex County Council to represent Stanwell. He was re-elected three times before unexpectedly losing his seat at the 1910 county council election. He was able to remain a member of the council when he chosen as a county alderman a few days later. He was Chairman of Middlesex County Council from 1919-24. In 1937 he retired from the county council when he did not seek re-election as an alderman.

Chairman and owner of market gardeners H. & A. Pullen Burry, Ltd. of Sompting, West Sussex; he was a director of the Dawley Wall Gravel Pit in the parish of Harlington; JP (Middlesex, 1896–1938), chairman of the bench 1921–1931; Deputy Lieutenant (Middlesex, from 1918); High Sheriff (Middlesex, 1905). (Note: By virtue of his having been Sheriff in 1905 a full heraldic achievement (as for a count de Salis) in stained glass was put up in his honour in the Middlesex Guildhall, formerly Old Court no. 1, now the Supreme Court's library.) In 1931 he became a companion of the Order of the Bath (CB) and was made a knight (KCB) of the same order in 1935.

During the First World War he sat for 449 days (from 25 February 1916) as one of the ten members of the Appeal Tribunal for the County of Middlesex, which he described: "This was sad work and many hard cases had to be dealt with, and often decided against the appellant". He was vice-chairman (1912–1925) and then chairman (1925–1936) of the Middlesex Territorial and Auxiliary Force Association. Through Middlesex County Council he was closely associated with the mental hospitals at Harperbury and Shenley. He was also a governor of Uxbridge County School, aka the Bishopshalt School, now in Hillingdon. He was a member of the Union Club (site now home to Canada House, Trafalgar Square).

The Belfast Gazette of 11 March 1927, records Cecil as having 18 parcels of land in county Armagh. These were at Dromart, Tandragee; Ballyworkan, Portadown; Tamnaghvelton; Tamnaghmore; and Brackagh, Portadown. These came to circa 140 acres and were valued at and compulsorily sold to the tenants for circa £2,000 in 1927.

== Family ==
He married, on 3 September 1889, Rachel Elizabeth Frances Waller, (born 1 January 1868; died 6 January 1954), only child and heir of Edmund Waller VI or VII, and had 14 children (9 sons, 5 daughters), living firstly, 1889–1896, with his father at Portnall Park and then at Dawley Court. t
