= Salis-Soglio =

Salis-Soglio can refer to:

- Peter von Salis-Soglio, 1st Count de Salis-Soglio
- Jerome de Salis-Soglio, 2nd Count de Salis-Soglio
- Jerome, 4th Count de Salis-Soglio
- Peter, 5th Count de Salis-Soglio
- John Francis William, 6th Count de Salis-Soglio
- John Francis Charles, 7th Count de Salis-Soglio

== See also ==
- De Salis (disambiguation)
- Salis family
