= Holy See–United Kingdom relations =

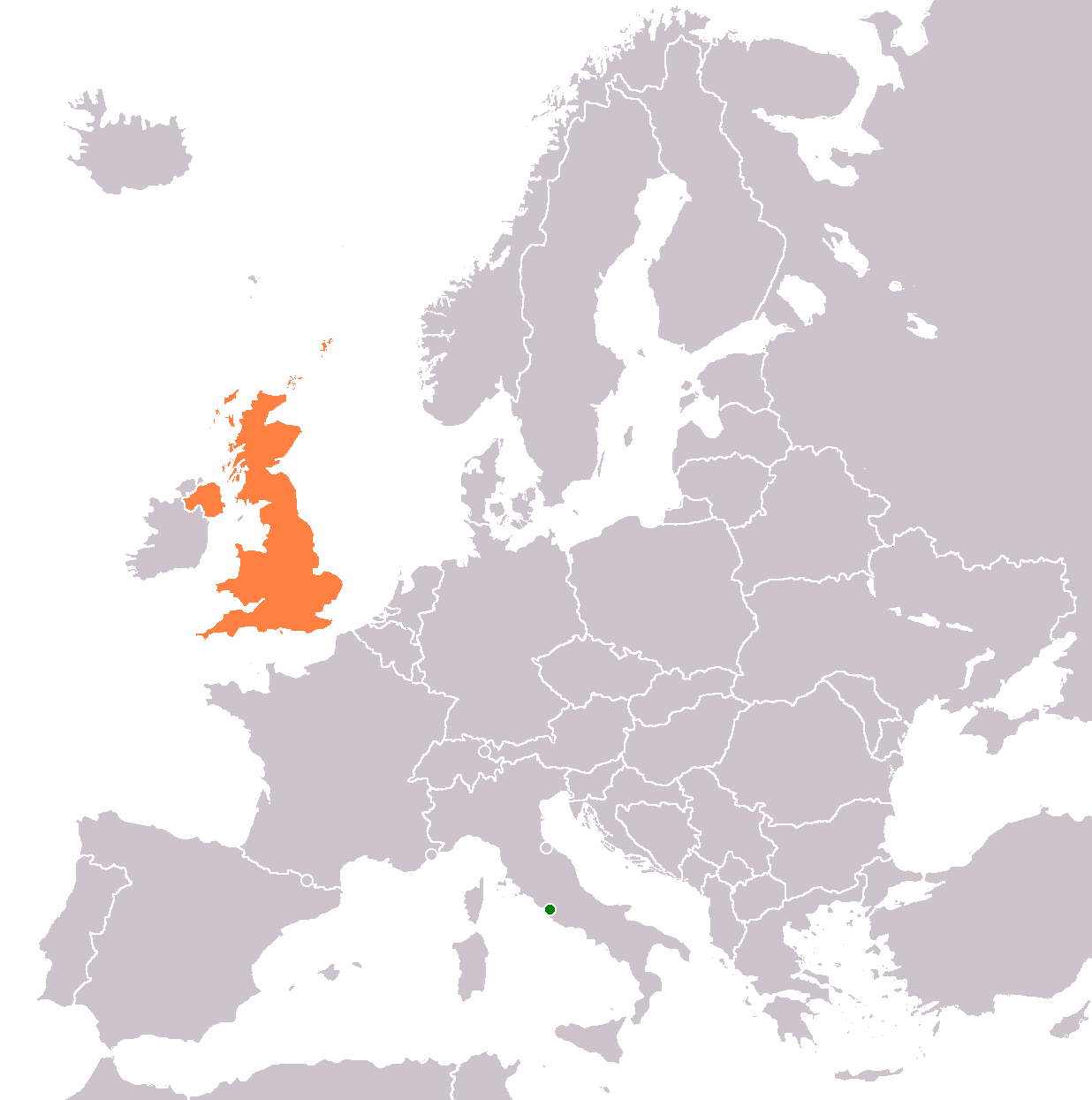

- Holy See: United Kingdom

Diplomatic mission
- Apostolic Nunciature to the Court of St James's: British Embassy to the Holy See

Envoy
- Apostolic Nuncio Claudio Gugerotti: Ambassador Tammy Sandhu

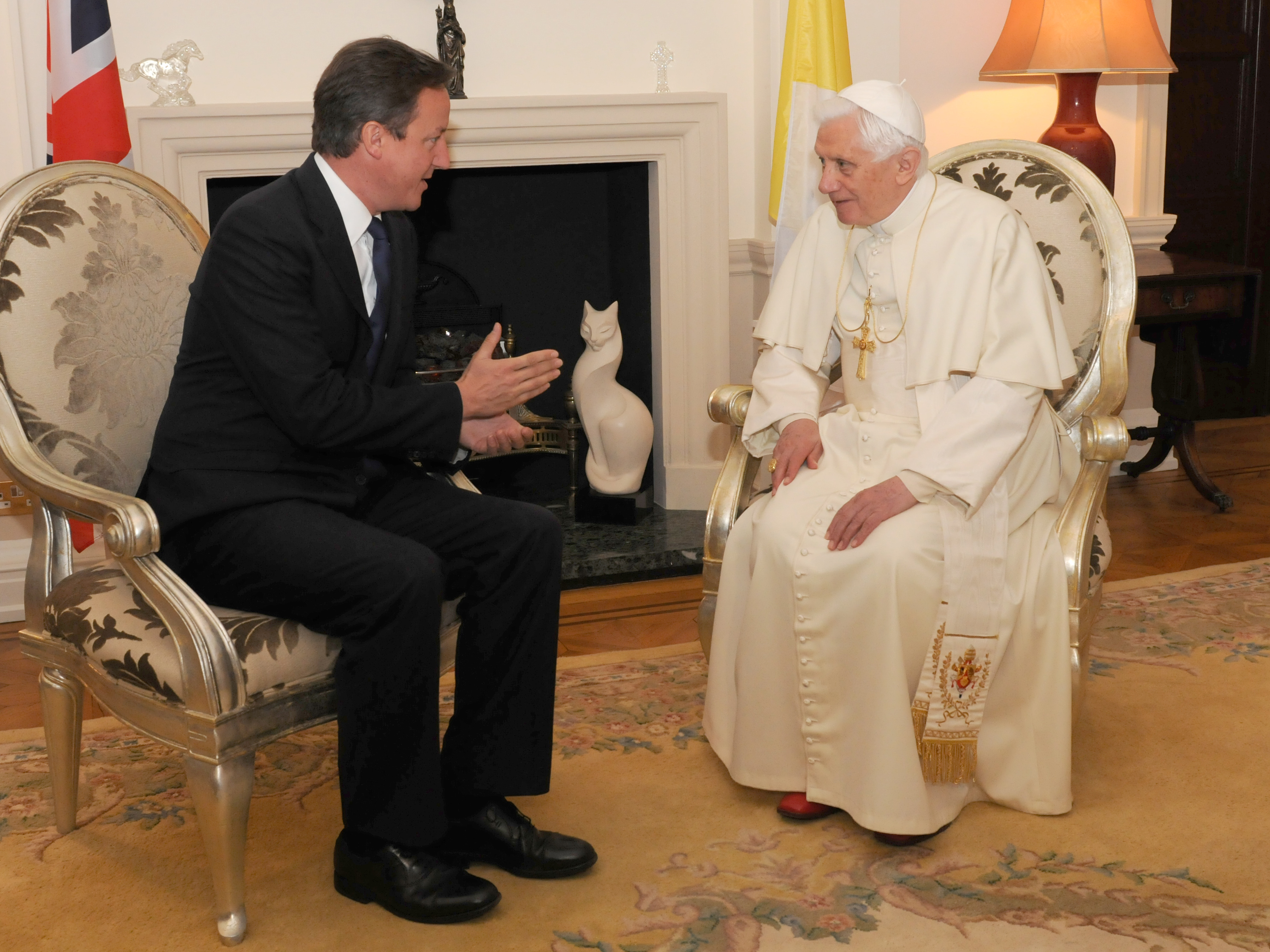
British Prime Minister David Cameron with Pope Benedict XVI in 10 Downing Street, September 2010.

Holy See–United Kingdom relations are foreign relations between the Holy See and the United Kingdom.

The Holy See maintains an Apostolic nunciature in London, and the United Kingdom has an Embassy in the Vatican City. The current Nuncio in London is Miguel Maury Buendía, and the British Ambassador is Tammy Sandhu.

== History ==
=== Early relations before 1536 ===
In circa 595, Pope Gregory I sent a mission now known as the Gregorian Mission to the Kingdom of Kent. Augustine became the first Archbishop of Canterbury in circa 597. During the Middle Ages and until the Protestant Reformation in the 16th century, the Kingdom of England and the Kingdom of Scotland were Catholic kingdoms with diplomatic relations with the Papal States.

In 1154 the English bishop Nicholas Breakspear was elected Pope Adrian IV, the only person from the British Isles to have been the Pope.

In 1209, Pope Innocent III put the Kingdom of England under interdict amidst rising disputes with John, King of England, after he refused to accept Stephen Langton, the papal candidate for Archbishop of Canterbury. The dispute was resolved in 1213 when John conceded power to the Pope by becoming his vassal and agreed to pay feudal taxes to the Catholic Church.

In 1479, Edward IV of England appointed John Sherwood as the first Resident Ambassador in the Papal States.

=== 1536: diplomatic rift and church schism ===
Diplomatic relations were broken in 1536, following the establishment of the Anglican Church by Henry VIII. Diplomatic relations were re-established in 1553 under Mary I of England, who appointed Sir Edward Carne as her Ambassador. During the reign of Elizabeth I diplomatic relations were broken again due to the papal bull Regnans in Excelsis in 1570. Official relations with the Papal States were then prohibited by law. The two countries nevertheless had occasional contacts.

In 1621, the English court despatched George Gage to the Papal court in order to obtain permission for Charles I of England to marry the Spanish infanta, a marriage that in the event did not take place. But when Charles I married a French Catholic princess named Henrietta Maria, he obtained the blessing of Pope Gregory XV, who used the opportunity to despatch Gregorio Panzani to England as his envoy. Panzani was followed as papal envoy by the Scottish Franciscan George Conn.

In 1686, King James VII of Scotland and II of England despatched as envoy to the Papal States the Earl of Castlemaine and received as papal envoy Count Fernando D'Adda. Relations were broken again following the Glorious Revolution in 1688. The Papal States recognised James Francis Edward Stuart as James VIII and III until his death in 1766, but not his son Charles, which gave subtle recognition to the reigning House of Hanover. This helped start the reform of the anti-Catholic penal laws, achieved in part by the Quebec Act 1774 and the Papists Act 1778. Sir John Coxe Hippisley's brief mission to Rome to explore the possibility of restoring relations failed in 1779–1780.

Unofficial relations were formed again during the French Revolution, as both the British and the Papal courts were interested in coordinating policies against the spread of the revolution across Europe. In 1792, the British court despatched Sir John Coxe Hippisley to Rome as envoy, a position he held until 1795. The papal court despatched Monsignor Charles Erskine to London as envoy, a position he held until 1801. Both countries found themselves at various times enemies of France during this period and therefore had a degree of commonality of interests, not least because of the dechristianisation of France during the French Revolution and the French establishment of the Roman Republic of 1798–99.

=== After the UK's formation ===
The United Kingdom of Great Britain and Ireland came into existence in 1801 with the union of the Kingdom of Ireland to Great Britain, which had been formed by the union of the Kingdoms of Scotland and England in 1707. With the Anglo-Irish Treaty of 1921, all of Ireland became an independent dominion. Northern Ireland exercised its right under that treaty to separate from the remainder of Ireland and maintain the union with Great Britain, which created the current state of the United Kingdom of Great Britain and Northern Ireland.

The Holy See is the pre-eminent episcopal see of the Catholic Church, forming the central government of the Church and recognised in international law as a sovereign entity with which diplomatic relations can be maintained. Pastor Bonus, an apostolic constitution, defines the Vatican's diplomatic relations with states as the Holy See.

Due to the continuity of the Holy See from early times, it is possible to see that the various parts of the United Kingdom had relations with the Holy See prior to their incorporation within the Union (and in Ireland's case, following it - see Holy See – Ireland relations).

Following the Catholic Emancipation Act 1829, legal obstacles to relations with the Papal States were removed, but the British government still refrained from accrediting an envoy to Rome, though British envoys to some Italian city states were also charged with conducting negotiations with the Papal Court. During the Irish tenants'-rights Plan of Campaign in the 1880s, the Papacy condemned the activities in the encyclical "Saepe Nos" (1888), even though most of the tenants were Catholics.

=== 20th century ===
The United Kingdom did not re-establish relations with the Holy See until December 1914, following the outbreak of the First World War, as the British government was apprehensive about possible growing German and Austrian influence over Vatican policies. The first envoy selected was Henry Howard, a British Catholic, who was followed by the 7th Count de Salis. In order to maintain that this diplomatic mission was temporary in nature, it was titled "Special Mission to the Vatican". Only in 1923 was the mission's title changed to "His Majesty's Legation to the Holy See".

During the Second World War when Italy was at war with Britain, the British mission and those other allied countries were located in a pilgrim hostel attached to the Convent of Santa Marta within the Vatican City. Until the liberation of Rome in 1944, the British Envoy Sir D'Arcy Osborne could not leave the Vatican without special Italian permission.

In May 1949, Princess Margaret visited Pope Pius XII in the Vatican City. It was the first visit of a British Royal to the Holy See after hundreds of years.

The problem of Northern Ireland has been a major issue in British-Vatican relations, and during the 1970s the Holy See expressed its hopes for a speedy and just solution on the issue. On 1 June 1974, Pope Paul VI called on all armed factions to take part in peace talks:

We earnestly beg that all violence should cease, from whatever side it may come, for it is contrary to the law of God and to a Christian and civilized way of life; that, in response to the common Christian conscience and the voice of reason, a climate of mutual trust and dialogue be reestablished in justice and charity; that the real and deep-seated causes of social unrest – which are not to be reduced to differences of a religious nature – be identified and eliminated.

The Holy See also supported the British efforts at bringing to an end to racial segregation in Rhodesia (present day Zimbabwe) and commended Queen Elizabeth II for her activities for peace among nations, and for peace between Catholics and Anglicans.

=== Recent developments ===
Full relations were recognised in 1982 when Pope John Paul II visited the UK. This led to the first full exchange of ambassadors between the UK and the Holy See that year.

On 9 September 2011, Ambassador Nigel Marcus Baker presented his credentials to Pope Benedict XVI. In his speech, the British Ambassador presented three main goals of Vatican-UK relations, namely facing existential threats such as climate change and nuclear proliferation, promoting interfaith dialogue to achieve peace and working to reduce world poverty.

The UK Embassy to the Holy See is co-located with the UK Embassy to the Republic of Italy at Via XX Settembre in Rome, following the 2006 closure of the rented building that had served as the UK's Embassy to the Holy See. Some in the Vatican protested the co-location of the UK's embassies, complaining that senior officials of the Holy See should not be required to visit the UK embassy to Italy, a country with which the Holy See has an entirely different and at times fractious relationship.

The Holy See's Nunciature to Great Britain is the diplomatic post of the Holy See whose representative is called the Apostolic Nuncio to Great Britain with the rank of an ambassador. The office of the nunciature is located at 54 Parkside, Wimbledon Village, London.

== State visits ==
Queen Elizabeth II first visited the Vatican during the pontificate of Pope Pius XII, before her own accession. Her second visit to the Vatican was a private visit (during a state visit to the Italian Republic) on 5 May 1962 when she was received by Pope John XXIII. She made two state visits during the pontificate of John Paul II in 1980 and 2000.

Charles, Prince of Wales and Camilla, Duchess of Cornwall met Pope Benedict XVI at the Vatican on 27 April 2009. Prince Charles and his second wife were granted a private audience with the pontiff. It was Charles's first audience at the Vatican since his divorce from Diana, Princess of Wales.

Pope Benedict XVI was the first Pope to make an official visit to the United Kingdom on 16 September 2010, which was accorded the status of a state visit. In a break with normal arrangements for state visits he arrived in Edinburgh rather than London and was granted an audience of Queen Elizabeth II at her official residence in Scotland, the Palace of Holyrood House. On the evening of the same day he celebrated the second Papal Mass ever held in Scotland at Bellahouston Park in Glasgow, with over 250,000 Scottish Catholics in attendance. The first Papal Mass in Scotland was celebrated by his predecessor Pope John Paul II at Bellahouston Park, Glasgow, during his pastoral visit in 1982.

Queen Elizabeth II and Prince Philip, Duke of Edinburgh, while visiting Italian President Giorgio Napolitano in Rome, had an informal visit with Pope Francis on 3 April 2014. It was her seventh encounter with a pope and the fifth different pope she met.

King Charles III and Queen Camilla, during their state visit to Italy, had a private meeting with Pope Francis at the Vatican on 9 April 2025. The couple were due to make a state visit to the Holy See at the same time, but this was postponed due to the pontiff's failing health.

King Charles III and Queen Camilla made a state visit to the Holy See in late October 2025, where they joined Pope Leo XIV in celebrating the 2025 Jubilee Year.

=== List of British Royal visits to the Vatican ===
- 29 April 1903 – King Edward VII meets Pope Leo XIII in a private capacity as neither Sovereign nor Head of the Church of England
- 1918 – Edward, Prince of Wales meets Pope Benedict XV
- 1923 – King George V and Queen Mary meet Pope Pius XI
- 10 May 1949 – Princess Margaret meets Pope Pius XII
- 13 April 1951 – Princess Elizabeth and the Prince Philip, Duke of Edinburgh meet Pope Pius XII
- 23 April 1959 – Queen Elizabeth the Queen Mother and Princess Margaret meet Pope John XXIII
- 5 May 1961 – Queen Elizabeth II and Prince Philip, Duke of Edinburgh pay an Official Visit to the Vatican City, calling on Pope John XXIII
- 17 October 1980 – Queen Elizabeth II, with Prince Philip, Duke of Edinburgh, pays her first State Visit to the Holy See and meets Pope John Paul II
- 28 May-2 June 1982 – Pastoral Visit of Pope John Paul II in Scotland
- 29 August 1985 – Charles, Prince of Wales and Diana, Princess of Wales meet Pope John Paul II
- 9 December 1985 – Prince and Princess Michael of Kent meet Pope John Paul II
- 10 April 1990 – Prince Philip, Duke of Edinburgh meets Pope John Paul II
- 3 November 1994 – Katharine, Duchess of Kent meets Pope John Paul II
- 17 October 2000 – Queen Elizabeth II and Prince Philip, Duke of Edinburgh meet Pope John Paul II
- 8 April 2005 – Charles, Prince of Wales attends the funeral of Pope John Paul II
- 24 April 2005 – Prince Philip, Duke of Edinburgh attends the inauguration of Pope Benedict XVI
- 27 April 2009 – Charles, Prince of Wales and Camilla, Duchess of Cornwall meet Pope Benedict XVI
- 16-19 September 2010 – State visit of Pope Benedict XVI in Scotland.
- 1 May 2011 – Prince Richard, Duke of Gloucester and Birgitte, Duchess of Gloucester attend the beatification of Pope John Paul II
- 19 March 2013 – Prince Richard, Duke of Gloucester and Birgitte, Duchess of Gloucester attend the inauguration of Pope Francis
- 3 April 2014 – Queen Elizabeth II and Prince Philip, Duke of Edinburgh meet Pope Francis
- 27 April 2014 – Prince Richard, Duke of Gloucester and Birgitte, Duchess of Gloucester meet Pope Francis on the occasion of canonisation of Pope John XXIII and Pope John Paul II
- 4 April 2017 – Charles, Prince of Wales and Camilla, Duchess of Cornwall meet Pope Francis
- 13 April 2019 – Charles, Prince of Wales meets Pope Francis on the occasion of the canonisation of Cardinal John Henry Newman
- 9 April 2025 – King Charles III and Queen Camilla meet Pope Francis
- 26 April 2025 – William, Prince of Wales attends the funeral of Pope Francis
- 18 May 2025 – Prince Edward, Duke of Edinburgh attends the inauguration of Pope Leo XIV
- 22-23 October 2025 — King Charles III, with Queen Camilla, pays a State Visit to the Holy See and meets Pope Leo XIV

== See also ==
- Apostolic Nunciature to Great Britain
- Anglican–Roman Catholic dialogue
- Anglican Catholic Church
- List of Ambassadors from the United Kingdom to the Holy See
- Foreign relations of the Holy See
- Papal visit to the United Kingdom
- Roman Catholicism in Scotland
- Roman Catholicism in Ireland
- Roman Catholicism in the United Kingdom
- Roman Catholicism in England and Wales
