= Peter Scarlett =

Peter Scarlett may refer to:

- Peter Campbell Scarlett (1804–1881), British diplomat
- Peter W.S.Y. Scarlett (1905–1987), British diplomat
