= List of ambassadors of the United Kingdom to the Holy See =

Ambassador of the United Kingdom to the Holy See Ambasciatore del Regno Unito alla Santa Sede
- Arms of the United Kingdom

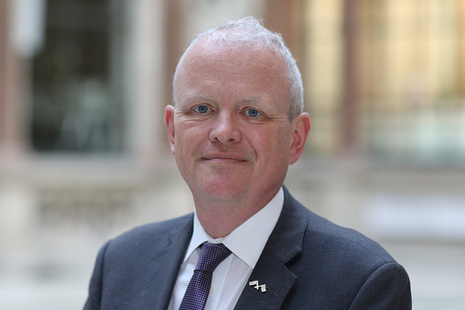
- Incumbent; Christopher Trott since 2021
- Style: His Excellency
- Appointer: King Charles III
- Inaugural holder: Thomas Aubin; First Attaché resident at Rome; Sir Henry Elliot; First Envoy extraordinary to the Holy See; Sir Mark Evelyn Heath; First Ambassador to the Holy See
- Formation: 1832; First Attaché resident at Rome; 1863; First Envoy extraordinary 1982; First Ambassador
- Website: UK and Holy See

The ambassador of the United Kingdom to the Holy See has held that title since 1982. Before that the British heads of mission to the Holy See were styled Attaché resident at Rome and Envoy Extraordinary and Minister Plenipotentiary.

== History of representation ==
Diplomatic relations were broken off between the Pope and the Kingdom of England in 1534, after the Act of Supremacy of that year declared that King Henry VIII was "the only Supreme Head in Earth of the Church of England". This break continued throughout the remaining existence of the Kingdom of England and its successor the Kingdom of Great Britain (1707–1800). However, after the formation of the United Kingdom of Great Britain and Ireland an "unofficial official" was kept in Rome from the mid-nineteenth century, holding the title of representative to the Papal States. With the rise of Italian nationalism, the Papal States were conquered by the House of Savoy and a unified Kingdom of Italy was declared in 1861. In 1874, due to the Roman Question, the Conservative government withdrew this representative, reasoning that it was not cost-effective to maintain a representative to a "non-existent state". Missions between 1874 and 1914 were designated "special and temporary".

In 1914 the United Kingdom formally re-established diplomatic relations with the Holy See. A minister was sent to the papal court during the First World War to court the favour of the Pope towards the Triple Entente. This mission was maintained after the war for the perceived value of its prestige (a "quiet place for a not very distinguished diplomat") and the conflicts in Ireland, Malta, Quebec, and Australia, which had Roman Catholic dimensions. After the rupture in 1930–33 due to difficulties in Malta, the post was filled with more experienced and respected diplomats.

From 1914 to 1982 the diplomatic representative of the United Kingdom to the Holy See had the rank of envoy extraordinary and minister plenipotentiary, as did the UK's representatives to many other countries until the 1960s, but partly because there was already a British ambassador in Rome, to Italy. The British envoy to the Holy See was upgraded to ambassador in 1982. It has been claimed that the minister was always a Protestant, and that Francis Campbell, appointed ambassador in 2005, was "the first Catholic to hold the position of emissary of the Court of St James's to the Holy See since the Reformation"; in fact, however, the first two 20th-century envoys, Sir Henry Howard and Count de Salis, were Catholics.

In May 2023, the British Embassy to the Holy See opened a new chancery closer to the Vatican. Concurrently, the official residence of the British Ambassador was relocated to a property situated directly on Vatican soil, a privilege unique among the diplomatic corps accredited to the Holy See.

== List of heads of mission ==
=== Attachés resident at Rome ===
The United Kingdom was represented by an Attaché to the legation at Florence resident at Rome.

- 1832–1844: Thomas Aubin
- 1844–1853: William Petre
- 1853–1858: Richard Lyons
- 1858–1870: Odo Russell
- 1870–1874: Henry Clarke Jervoise
- 1874: post abolished

=== Envoys extraordinary and ministers plenipotentiary ===
- 1914–1916: Sir Henry Howard
- 1916–1923: John Francis Charles, 7th Count de Salis-Soglio
- 1922–1928: Hon. Sir Odo Russell
- 1928–1930: Sir Henry Chilton

Relations downgraded due to the Church's interference in Maltese politics

=== Chargés d'affaires ===
- 1930–1932: George Ogilvie-Forbes
- 1932–1933: Sir Ivone Kirkpatrick

=== Envoys extraordinary and ministers plenipotentiary ===
- 1933–1934: Sir Robert Clive
- 1934–1936: Sir Charles Wingfield
- 1936–1947: Sir D'Arcy Osborne
- 1947–1951: Sir Victor Perowne
- 1951–1954: Sir Walter Roberts
- 1954–1957: Sir Douglas Howard
- 1957–1960: Sir Marcus Cheke
- 1960–1965: Sir Peter Scarlett
- 1965–1970: Sir Michael Williams
- 1970–1975: Desmond Crawley
- 1975–1977: Dugald Malcolm
- 1978–1980: Geoffrey Allan Crossley
- 1980–1982: Sir Mark Evelyn Heath

=== Ambassadors ===
- 1982–1985: Sir Mark Evelyn Heath
- 1985–1988: David Lane
- 1988–1991: John Broadley
- 1991–1995: Andrew Palmer
- 1995–1998: Maureen MacGlashan
- 1998–2002: Mark Pellew
- 2002–2005: Kathryn Colvin
- 2005–2011: Francis Campbell
- 2011–2011: George Edgar (chargé d'affaires)
- 2011–2016: Nigel Baker
- 2016–2021: Sally Axworthy
- 2021–present: Christopher Trott

== See also ==
- Holy See–United Kingdom relations
