= 1981 Special Honours =

British government recognitions

As part of the British honours system, Special Honours are issued at the Monarch's pleasure at any given time. The Special Honours refer to the awards made within royal prerogative, operational honours and other honours awarded outside the New Years Honours and Birthday Honours.

== Life peer ==
=== Baronesses ===
- Felicity Jane, Mrs. Ewart-Biggs, Widow of Christopher Thomas Ewart-Biggs, C.M.G., O.B.E., formerly H.M. Ambassador, Dublin.
- Miss Felicity Lane Fox, O.B.E., vice-president, Royal Association of Disability and Rehabilitation. Chairman, The Phipps Respiratory Unit Patients' Association, St. Thomas's Hospital, London.
- Rachel Trixie Anne, Mrs. Gardner, Member, Greater London Council. British Chairman, European Union of Women.
- Beryl Catherine, Mrs. Platt, C.B.E., Vice-chairman, Essex County Council.

=== Barons ===
- Professor Sir Max Beloff, lately Principal, University College at Buckingham.
- The Right Honourable Edward Stanley Bishop, Member of Parliament for Newark, Nottingham 1964–1979; Minister of State, Ministry of Agriculture, Fisheries and Food 1974–1979.
- Alan Robertson Campbell, Q.C. A Recorder of the Crown Court.
- Hugh Gater Jenkins, Member of Parliament for Wandsworth, Putney 1964-1979; Minister for the Arts 1974–1976.
- John Mackie, Member of Parliament for Enfield East 1959–1974; Parliamentary Secretary, Ministry of Agriculture, Fisheries and Food 1964–1970. Chairman, Forestry Commission 1976–1979.
- William John Molloy, Member of Parliament for Ealing North 1964-1979; Member of European Parliament 1976–1979.
- Dafydd Elystan Morgan, Member of Parliament for Cardigan 1966-1974; Parliamentary Under-secretary of State, Home Office 1968–1970.
- Sir Arthur Desmond Herne Plummer, T.D., D.L., chairman, Horserace Betting Levy Board. Formerly Leader of the Greater London Council.
- The Right Honourable James Anthony Stodart, Member of Parliament for Edinburgh West 1959- 1974; Minister of State, Ministry of Agriculture, Fisheries and Food 1972–1974.
- Hugh Swynnerton Thomas, Historian. Chairman, Centre for Policy Studies.
- Geoffrey Johnson Tordoff, Manager, Public Affairs (Chemicals) Shell U.K. Limited. Chairman, Campaigns Committee, Liberal Party.

== Order of the Thistle ==
Ribbon bar of the Order of the Thistle

=== Knight of the Order of the Thistle (KT) ===
- The Right Honourable Andrew Douglas Alexander Thomas Bruce, Earl of Elgin and Kincardine – 30 November 1981
- The Right Honourable George Morgan Thomson, Lord Thomson of Monifieth, PC – 30 November 1981

== Royal Victorian Order ==
=== Dame Commander of the Royal Victorian Order (DCVO) ===
- Miss Gillian Gerda Brown, C.M.G.

=== Commander of the Royal Victorian Order (CVO) ===
- Andrew Eustace Palmer.

=== Member of the Royal Victorian Order, 4th Class (LVO) ===
- Commander Francis Noel Ponsonby, Royal Navy.

=== Member of the Royal Victorian Order, 5th Class (MVO) ===
- Peter Warren Chandley.
- Maurice Leonard Dalton.

== Order of the British Empire ==
=== Officer of the Order of the British Empire (OBE) ===
- Lieutenant Colonel John Robert Collins (455000), The Staffordshire Regiment (The Prince of Wales's).
- Lieutenant Colonel Michael John Reece, Royal Marines.
- Lieutenant Colonel Colin Gordon Thomson (461669), The Parachute Regiment

=== Member of the Order of the British Empire (MBE) ===
- Major William Douglas Cantley (485686), Royal Tank Regiment.
- Major Timothy Richard Cottis (472515), The Staffordshire Regiment (The Prince of Wales's).
- Major Brian Keith Glover (443340), Ulster Defence Regiment.
- Major Christopher Gordon Fleet Mitchinson (479301), The Royal Scots (The Royal Regiment).
- Major George Eustace Maurice Stephens (377206), Ulster Defence Regiment
- Captain Robert Alan Fry, Royal Marines.
- 4026874 Warrant Officer Class 1, Michael David Heath, Royal Army Ordnance Corps.

== Air Force Cross (AFC) ==
- Flight Lieutenant Thomas William McRoberts Campbell (4231142), Royal Air Force.
- Captain Anthony Markham (503566), Army Air Corps.

== George Medal (GM) ==
- Flight Lieutenant Michael Julian Lakey (4232923), Royal Air Force.
- Trevor James Lock, Constable, Metropolitan Police.

== Air Force Medal (AFM) ==
- D8140974 Sergeant Richard John Bragg, Royal Air Force.
- 23947293 Sergeant Alan Owbridge, Army Air Corps.

== Queen's Gallantry Medal (QGM) ==
=== Bar to the Queen's Gallantry ===
- 24008470 Staff Sergeant Peter Guy Brunton Ellis, Q.G.M., Corps of Royal Engineers.

=== Queen's Gallantry Medal ===
- 23938393 Warrant Officer Class 2, Malcolm Charles Boscott, Royal Army Ordnance Corps.
- W/459004 Corporal (Acting Sergeant) Jane Elizabeth Freeman, Women's Royal Army Corps.
- 24060244 Staff Sergeant John Edward Kerr, The Royal Green Jackets.

== Royal Victorian Medal ==
=== Silver ===
- Frank James Duffy.

=== Bronze ===
- Cecil James Smith.

== British Empire Medal ==
=== Military Division ===
- Colour Sergeant Robert Ernest Balment, PO22095H, Royal Marines.
- Sergeant Arthur Alan Bowden, P024018C, Royal Marines.
- 24262128 Sergeant Ian Andrew McPherson, Royal Army Ordnance Corps.
- 24275953 Sergeant David Purvis, Ulster Defence Regiment.
- 24056326 Staff Sergeant Peter Victor Richart, Royal Tank Regiment.

== Queen's Commendation for Brave Conduct ==
- Squadron Leader Hamish Sutherland Grant (5200783), Royal Air Force.

== Queen's Commendation for Valuable Service in the Air ==
- Flight Lieutenant David Anthony Simpson (5202710), Royal Air Force.
- 24168248 Lance Corporal Philip Worviell, Army Air Corps.

== Mention in Despatches ==
- Major (now Acting Lieutenant Colonel) David Robert Chaundler (476479), The Parachute Regiment.
- Lieutenant Colonel John Muir Clavering, M.C. (465919), Scots Guards.
- 23682016 Warrant Officer Class 1 (now Lieutenant), Eric George Cook, Royal Army Ordnance Corps.
- 24215075 Sergeant John Leslie Dickens, 16th/5th The Queen's Royal Lancers.
- 24087618 Sergeant (now Acting Staff Sergeant) Graham Frederick Dyer, Intelligence Corps.
- 23849707 Warrant Officer Class 2 Terence James Ellison, The Staffordshire Regiment (The Prince of Wales's).
- 24167931 Bombardier (Acting Sergeant) Clive Frank Flint, Royal Regiment of Artillery.
- 24393910 Lance Corporal Stephen Andrew Harbord, Royal Tank Regiment.
- Colonel Patrick Rolf Shaun Jackson, O.B.E. (420860), late Royal Regiment of Artillery.
- Captain Roger Guy Tyson Lane, Royal Marines.
- Lieutenant John McCubbin, Royal Marines.
- Lieutenant (Acting Captain) Robert Alan McFarland (499625), Royal Tank Regiment.
- 24099485 Corporal Stephen Francis Miller, The Staffordshire Regiment (The Prince of Wales's).
- 23996405 Warrant Officer Class 2 Henry Alexander Pinchard, Intelligence Corps.
- Corporal Gary James Pipe, PO35651N, Royal Marines.
- Lieutenant Colonel John Keith Pitt, O.B.E. (430177), Royal Corps of Transport.
- 24469517 Private Tony John Portsmouth, The Parachute Regiment.
- 24072917 Sergeant David Bernard Ian Powlesland, Royal Tank Regiment.
- 24280296 Sergeant (Acting Warrant Officer Class 2) Alexander Roy, Ulster Defence Regiment.
- Major William Gaskell Rudd (493451), Ulster Defence Regiment.
- 24211677 Sergeant Steven Arthur Smith, The Staffordshire Regiment (The Prince of Wales's).
- Major James Edward Snape (492396), Corps of Royal Engineers.
- 24282933 Lance Corporal Mark Anthony Snelson, Royal Army Ordnance Corps.
- Lieutenant Colonel Hugh Nicholas Tarver (457286), The Queen's Regiment.
- 24102285 Staff Sergeant Aled Wyn Thomas, Royal Regiment of Artillery.
- Major Charles Gerard Courtenay Vyvyan, M.B.E. (484776), The Royal Green Jackets.
- 23991727 Warrant Officer Class 2 Eric John Watt, Royal Tank Regiment.
- Lieutenant Colonel Roger Greville Webster (454947), Royal Regiment of Artillery.
- Lieutenant Colonel Clive Anthony Wilkinson (443595), Royal Regiment of Artillery.
- Lieutenant Colonel David Anthony Williams (475901), Royal Tank Regiment.
