= 1924 Dissolution Honours =

British government recognitions

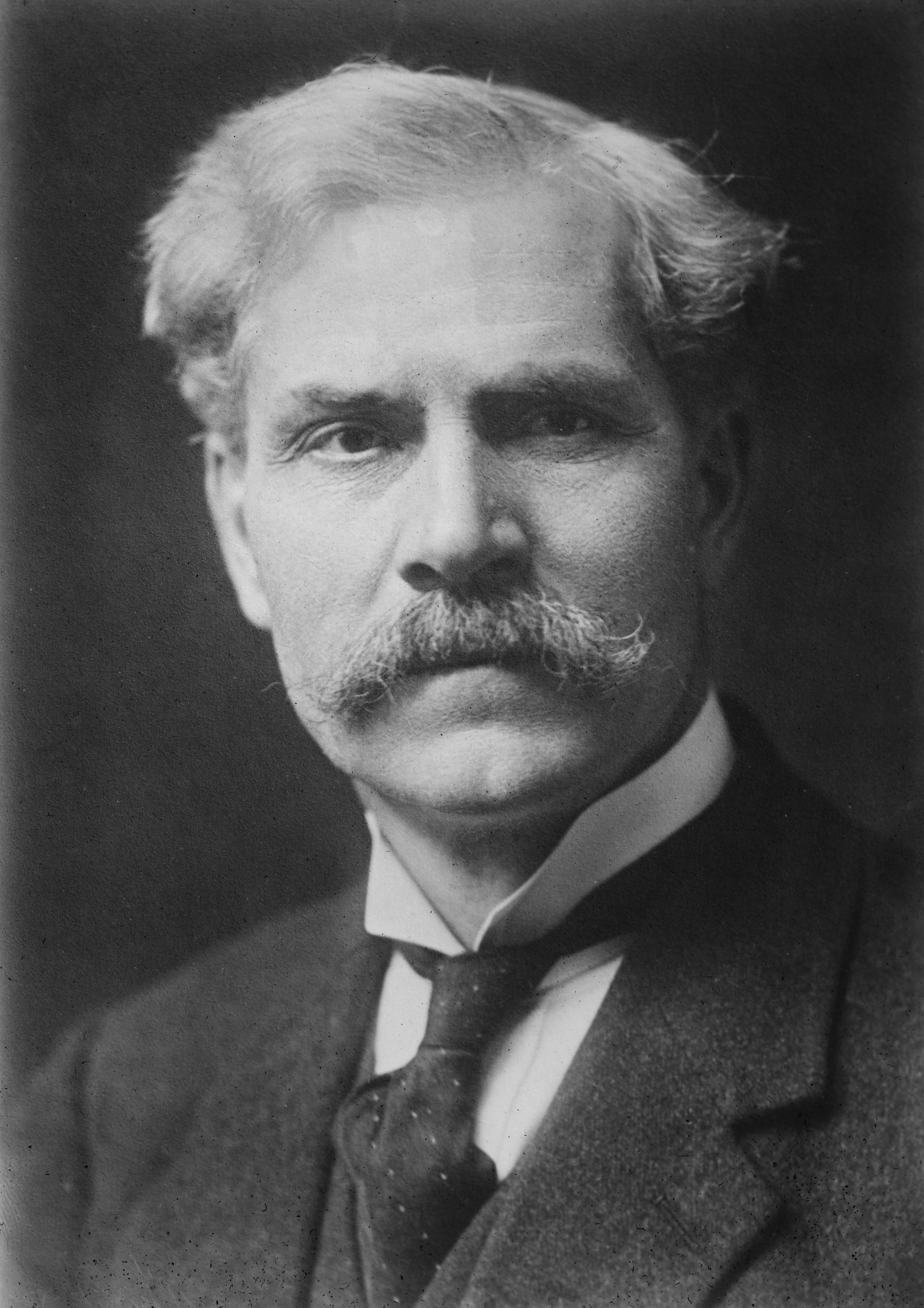
Ramsay MacDonald

The 1924 Dissolution Honours List was issued on 7 November 1924 at the advice of the outgoing Prime Minister, Ramsay MacDonald.

== Privy Council ==
- William Graham MP, Financial Secretary to the Treasury
- Benjamin Charles Spoor MP, Parliamentary Secretary to the Treasury

== Order of St.Michael and St. George ==
=== Knight Commander (KCMG) ===
- Sir Cecil James Barrington Hurst, KCB KC, Legal advisor to the Foreign Office.

== Royal Victorian Order ==
=== Commander (CVO) ===
- Walford Harmood Montague Selby, MVO
- Charles Patrick Duff
