= Geoffrey Allan Crossley =

British diplomat

Geoffrey Allan Crossley, CMG (11 November 1920 – 13 June 2009) was a British diplomat, ambassador to Colombia and to the Holy See.

== Career ==
Crossley was educated at Penistone Grammar School and Gonville and Caius College, Cambridge. During the Second World War he served in the Ministry of Supply (1941) and the Foreign Office (1942) and subsequently in Algeria and France. In 1945 he joined the Foreign Service and served as Second Secretary in Paris 1945–48. From 1949 to 1952 he was one of the two UK delegates to the United Nations Special Committee on the Balkans (UNSCOB). He was then posted to Singapore as deputy Regional Information Officer with the Commissioner-General for South-East Asia. In 1957–59 he served in the Consulate-General, Frankfurt, for the transition of the Saarland from French occupation to Germany. He was a Political Officer (later in charge of the Political Department) in the Middle East Command, later the Near East Command, Cyprus, 1959–61; Head of Chancery at Bern 1961–65; on secondment to the Ministry of Overseas Development as Head of the West and North Africa Department 1965–67; Deputy High Commissioner, Lusaka, 1967–69; and Counsellor, Oslo, 1969–73. His final diplomatic appointments were as Ambassador to Colombia, 1973–77 and Envoy to the Holy See, 1978–80.

After retiring from the Diplomatic Service, Crossley was Director, External Relations and Continuing Education, European Institute of Business Administration (INSEAD), Fontainebleau, 1980–84.

Crossley was appointed CMG in 1984.

Diplomatic posts
Preceded by Thomas Edward Rogers	Ambassador from the United Kingdom to Colombia; 1973 – 1977	Succeeded by Richard Neilson
Preceded by Dugald Malcolm	Ambassador from the United Kingdom to the Holy See; 1978 – 1980	Succeeded by Sir Mark Heath
