= Francis Oswald Lindley =

British diplomat

The Right Honourable Sir Francis Oswald Lindley GCMG CB CBE
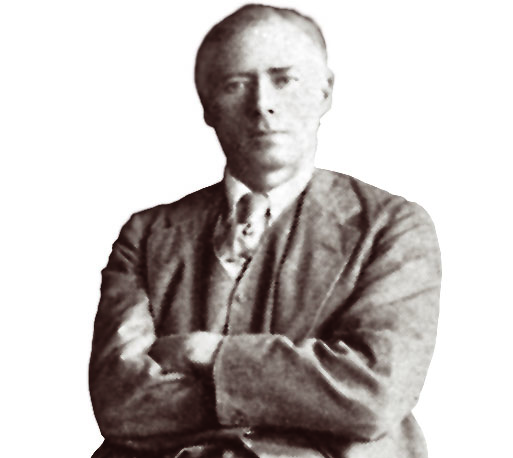

British Ambassador to Japan
- In office 1931–1934
- Monarch: George V
- Prime Minister: Ramsay MacDonald
- Preceded by: Sir John Tilley
- Succeeded by: Sir Robert Clive

British Ambassador to Portugal
- In office 1929–1931
- Monarch: George V
- Prime Minister: Ramsay MacDonald
- Preceded by: Sir Colville Barclay
- Succeeded by: Sir Claud Russell

Minister of the United Kingdom to Norway
- In office 1923–1929
- Monarch: George V
- Prime Minister: Stanley Baldwin; Ramsay MacDonald
- Preceded by: Sir Mansfeldt Findlay
- Succeeded by: Sir Charles Wingfield

British Ambassador to Greece
- In office 1921–1922
- Monarch: George V
- Prime Minister: David Lloyd George
- Preceded by: Granville Leveson-Gower, 3rd Earl Granville
- Succeeded by: Sir Milne Cheetham

British Ambassador to Austria
- In office 1919–1921
- Monarch: George V
- Prime Minister: David Lloyd George
- Preceded by: Sir Maurice de Bunsen
- Succeeded by: Aretas Akers-Douglas, 2nd Viscount Chilston

Personal details
- Born: 12 June 1872 East Carleton, Norwich
- Died: 17 August 1950 (aged 78)
- Spouse: Etheldreda Mary Fraser (m. 1903; died 1949)
- Children: 4
- Parent(s): Nathaniel Lindley, Baron Lindley; Sarah Katharine Teale Lindley
- Education: Winchester College
- Alma mater: Magdalen College, Oxford

Sir Francis Oswald Lindley GCMG CB CBE PC (12 June 1872 – 17 August 1950) was a British diplomat who was HM Consul-General in Russia in 1919, British High Commissioner in Vienna 1919–1920, Ambassador to Austria 1920–1921, Ambassador to Greece 1922–1923, Minister in Oslo 1923–1929, Ambassador to Portugal 1929–1931, and finally Ambassador to Japan 1931–1934. Lindley was described as "a rather tough old character in some respects and very outspoken in his likes and dislikes."

== Early life ==
Lindley was born on 12 June 1872 at The Lodge, East Carleton, Norwich in the county of Norfolk. He was the fourth son of nine children born to Nathaniel Lindley, Baron Lindley, an English judge who served as Master of the Rolls and Lord of Appeal in Ordinary (and namesake of Mount Lindley in Antarctica), and Sarah Katharine Teale, daughter of Edward John Teale of Leeds.

His paternal grandparents were John Lindley, a botanist and orchidologist, and Sarah (née Freestone) Lindley, a descendant of Sir Edward Coke.

He was educated at Winchester College and Magdalen College, Oxford.

== Career ==
Lindley became an Attaché in 1896 and a Clerk at the Foreign Office in 1897. He was appointed Acting Third Secretary in Vienna in 1899, and served in Tehran from 1900 to 1901. Promoted Second Secretary in the Diplomatic Service in October 1902, before serving the Egyptian Government from 1902 to 1904, he was next in HM Agency in Cairo for two years, then in Tokyo from 1906 to 1908, returning to London for a home posting in the Foreign Office, 1908–1909.

He was promoted First Secretary in the Diplomatic Service in 1909 and served in Sofia, 1909–1911, Christiania, 1912, and as Counsellor of the British Embassy at Petrograd, 1915. More senior postings came after the Great War. Lindley was appointed H.M. Commissioner in Russia in June 1918 and H.M. Consul-General there in 1919, where "he earned the respect of the Bolsheviks."

Lindley served as High Commissioner in Vienna from 1919 to 1920. He succeeded Sir Maurice de Bunsen as the Envoy Extraordinary and Minister Plenipotentiary to the Republic of Austria, serving between 1920 and 1921, and then succeeded Granville Leveson-Gower, 3rd Earl Granville as the Ambassador to Greece between 1921 and 1922, until a break in diplomatic relations in 1922.

Beginning in 1923, he succeeded Sir Mansfeldt Findlay as the Minister to Norway in Oslo. In 1929, he succeeded Sir Colville Barclay as the Ambassador to Portugal, serving until 1931. His final diplomatic post was as the Ambassador Extraordinary and Plenipotentiary to Japan from 1931 to 1934 during the reign of Emperor Hirohito. While in Japan, he did not live in the Ambassador's residence, which was still being reconstructed after the 1923 Great Kantō earthquake, but at the embassy house in Chuzenji.

Lindley had his final audience as Ambassador with George V on 2 June 1934.

=== Later life ===
From 1935 to 1949, he was the chairman of the Council of the Japan Society of London, and he unsuccessfully stood as a Conservative candidate for Parliament at the 1937 Combined English Universities by-election. In retirement, Lindley lived at The Weir House, Alresford, Hampshire, and in 1934 was appointed a Justice of the Peace for the county. He belonged to the Turf Club and Brooks's. He was an official Verderer of the New Forest from 1943.

In 1947, he published an autobiography entitled A Diplomat Off Duty.

== Personal life ==
Lindley married at St Mary′s Roman Catholic Church, Eskadale, Inverness-shire, on 12 January 1903 to Honourable Etheldreda Mary Fraser (1872–1949), third daughter of Simon Fraser, 13th Lord Lovat. The wedding was celebrated at Beaufort Castle, the traditional seat of the Lords Lovat. Her elder brother was Simon Fraser, 14th Lord Lovat and among her younger siblings was Alastair Thomas Joseph Fraser (who married Lady Sybil Grimston, daughter of James Grimston, 3rd Earl of Verulam) and Margaret May Fraser (who married Brig-Gen Archibald Stirling, son of Sir William Stirling-Maxwell, 9th Baronet). They had four daughters, all of whom had prominent marriages:

- Brigid Mary Lindley (d. 1971), who married Sir John McEwen, 1st Baronet (1894–1962).
- Sarah Katharine Lindley (d. 1965), who married Philip Yorke, 9th Earl of Hardwicke (1906–1974).
- Alice Elizabeth Lindley (1905–1995), who married Sir Oscar Morland (1904–1980), the British Ambassador in Japan and Indonesia, in 1932.
- Mary Etheldreda Lindley (1911–2009), who married Sir William Johnstone Keswick (1903–1990), son of politician and businessman Henry Keswick of the prominent Hong Kong based Keswick family.

Lindley's wife died in 1949 and he died on 17 August 1950.

=== Descendants ===
Through his daughter Brigid, he was the grandfather of seven, including:

- Sir James McEwen of Marchmont and Bardrochat, 2nd Bt. (1924–1971), who married Clare Rosemary Sandars;
- Sir Robert McEwen of Marchmont and Bardrochat, 3rd Bt. (1926–1980), who married Brigid Cecilia Laver (daughter of James Laver and Veronica Turleigh);
- Christian Mary McEwen (1929–2006), who married Frederick Fermor-Hesketh, 2nd Baron Hesketh;
- Roderick McEwen (1932–1982), a folk singer and botanical artist who married Romana von Hofmannsthal (daughter of Ava Alice Muriel Astor);
- Alexander Dundas McEwen (1935–2008), a musician who married Cecilia Gräfin von Weikersheim;
- David Fraser McEwen (1938–1976);
- John Sebastian McEwen (b. 1942).

Through his daughter Mary he was the grandfather of:

- Sir Henry Keswick (1938–2024), one of Britain's richest men who married Annabel Thérèse "Tessa" Fraser, Lady Reay (a daughter of war hero Simon Fraser, 15th Lord Lovat and the former wife of Hugh Mackay, 14th Lord Reay);
- Sir John Chippendale Keswick (1940–2024), who married Lady Sarah Ramsay, a daughter of Simon Ramsay, 16th Earl of Dalhousie;
- Simon Keswick (b. 1942), who married Emma Bridget Chetwode, a daughter of Maj. George David Chetwode.

Both Sir Henry and Sir Chips served as chairman of Jardine Matheson Holdings.

Through his daughter Sarah, he was the grandfather of:

- Lady Amabel Yorke (b. 1935), wife of Hon. Patrick Lindsay (son of David Lindsay, 28th Earl of Crawford);
- Philip Yorke, Viscount Royston (1938–1973), father of Joseph Yorke, 10th Earl of Hardwicke;
- Lady Victoria Yorke (1947–2004), who married Nigel Waymouth (parents of writer Louis Waymouth);
- Lady Rose Yorke (b. 1951), who married three times.

== Publications ==
- A Diplomat off Duty, Ernest Benn Limited, London, 1928 (second edition 1947)
- Lord Lovat: a biography, Hutchinson & Co. Ltd, London, 1935
- The tragedy of Spain, Loxley Brothers Ltd, London, 1937 (reprinted from the National Review, February 1937)

== Combined English Universities ==
1937 Combined English Universities by-election

Combined English Universities by-election, 1937 Electorate 28,808
Party	Candidate	Votes	%	±%
Independent Progressive	Thomas Edmund Harvey	6,596	47.4	N/A
Conservative	Rt Hon. Sir Francis Lindley	4,952	35.6	N/A
Independent	Sir Henry Brackenbury	2,373	17.0	N/A
Majority		1,644	11.8	N/A
Turnout		13,921	48.3	N/A
Independent Progressive gain from Conservative		Swing	N/A	

== Honours ==
- Commander of the Order of the British Empire (CBE), 1917
- Companion of the Order of the Bath (CB), 1919
- Knight Commander of the Order of St Michael and St George (KCMG), 1926 Birthday Honours
- Privy Counsellor (PC), 1929
- Knight Grand Cross of the Order of St Michael and St George (GCMG), 1931 New Year Honours

Diplomatic posts
Preceded by Sir Maurice de Bunsen	British Ambassador to Austria; 1919–1921	Succeeded by Aretas Akers-Douglas, 2nd Viscount Chilston
Preceded by Granville Leveson-Gower, 3rd Earl Granville	British Ambassador to Greece; 1921–1922	Succeeded by Sir Milne Cheetham
Preceded by Sir Mansfeldt Findlay	Minister of the United Kingdom to Norway; 1923–1929	Succeeded by Sir Charles Wingfield
Preceded by Sir John Tilley	British Ambassador to Japan; 1931–1934	Succeeded by Sir Robert Clive
