= Walter Roberts (diplomat) =

British diplomat

Sir Walter Roberts KCMG OStJ MC (14 December 1893 – 18 November 1978) was a British diplomat. He was the only son of Judge Roberts, a Judge of the Clerkenwell County Court.

== Career ==
Walter St Clair Howland Roberts was educated at Winchester College and Brasenose College, Oxford. He was admitted to the Middle Temple on 4 April 1914, withdrawing without being Called to the Bar on 13 January 1927. During the First World War he was a prisoner of war 1914–16, then served with the Royal Field Artillery 1917–19. He was awarded the Military Cross in 1918; the citation read:

For conspicuous gallantry and devotion to duty. When his battery was under heavy shell fire, his utter contempt for danger was an inspiring example to all ranks, and it was largely due to his coolness that all guns were saved.

Roberts entered the Foreign Office in 1919. He was head of the Western Europe Department 1936–39 and of the Prisoner of War Department 1941–45. He was British Ambassador to Peru 1945–48; Minister to Romania 1949–51; and finally Minister to the Holy See 1951–53.

Walter Roberts was appointed CMG in 1937 and knighted KCMG in 1951. He was made an Officer of the Order of St John in 1974.

Diplomatic posts
Preceded by Courtenay Forbes	British Ambassador to Peru; 1945–1948	Succeeded by James Dodds
Preceded by Sir Victor Perowne	Envoy Extraordinary and Minister Plenipotentiary to the Holy See; 1951 – 1953	Succeeded by Sir Douglas Howard
