= Charles Wingfield =

British diplomat

Sir Charles John FitzRoy Rhys Wingfield KCMG (18 February 1877 – 26 March 1960) was a British diplomat who was envoy to several countries.

== Career ==
Charles Wingfield was educated at Charterhouse and wished to join the Army (like his father and three brothers) but was prevented by poor health. He did join a militia battalion of the Royal Fusiliers in 1895, promoted to captain in 1898, but as he was not allowed to serve in the South African War, he left the army in 1901 to join the Diplomatic Service as an attaché. His early postings were at Paris, Athens, Berlin and Madrid, rising to the rank of Third Secretary in 1903 and Second Secretary in 1907; in 1909 he was posted to Christiania (now Oslo) where he acted as chargé d'affaires in the absence of the Minister in 1909, 1910 and 1911; in 1914 he was promoted to First Secretary; in 1915 he moved to Tokyo in 1915 and spent the rest of the war there; in 1919 he was promoted to Counsellor and sent back to Madrid where he again served as chargé d'affaires in 1920, 1921 and 1922; to Brussels in 1922 (chargé d'affaires 1923, 1924, 1925); and to Rome in 1926 (chargé d'affaires 1926, 1927, 1928). In 1928 he gained his first post as head of mission, as Envoy Extraordinary and Minister Plenipotentiary to the King of Siam, but he stayed there less than a year before returning to Oslo as envoy to Norway. He was envoy to the Holy See 1934–35 and finally Ambassador to Portugal 1935–37, an important post at the time because of the effect on Portugal of the Spanish Civil War.

== Family ==
Charles Wingfield, a great-great-grandson of Richard Wingfield, 4th Viscount Powerscourt, was the third son of Edward Rhys Wingfield who had inherited Barrington Park, near Great Barrington, Gloucestershire, from his maternal grandfather George Rice-Trevor, 4th Baron Dynevor (members of the Wingfield family still own Barrington Park). In 1905 Charles Wingfield married Lucy Evelyn, elder daughter of Sir Edmund Fane, also a diplomat; later that year her sister Etheldred Constantia Fane married another diplomat, Horace Rumbold.

== Honours ==
Charles Wingfield was appointed Companion of the Order of St Michael and St George (CMG) in the 1927 Birthday Honours and knighted in the same order in the 1933 New Year Honours.

Diplomatic posts
Preceded by Sydney Waterlow	Envoy Extraordinary and Minister Plenipotentiary to His Majesty the King of Siam; 1929	Succeeded by Cecil Dormer
Preceded by Sir Francis Lindley	Envoy Extraordinary and Minister Plenipotentiary to His Majesty the King of Norway; 1929–1934	Succeeded by Sir Cecil Dormer
Preceded by Sir Robert Clive	Envoy Extraordinary and Minister Plenipotentiary to the Holy See; 1934–1935	Succeeded by Sir D'Arcy Osborne
Preceded by Sir Claud Russell	Ambassador Extraordinary and Plenipotentiary at Lisbon; 1935–1937	Succeeded by Sir Walford Selby
