= Douglas Howard (diplomat) =

British diplomat

Sir Douglas Frederick Howard KCMG MC (15 February 1897 – 26 December 1987) was a British diplomat.

== Career ==
Douglas Howard was educated at Harrow School. He served in the British Army during the First World War and was awarded the Military Cross for an action while he was attached as Intelligence Officer to the 54th Infantry Brigade. The citation read:

"For great gallantry and devotion to duty as Brigade intelligence officer near Preux-au-Bois, on 4 November 1918. When the attack was temporarily held up he proceeded, under heavy fire, to the spot, and having pushed forward in front of the front line he sent back accurate and valuable reports. Throughout recent operations his conduct has been admirable."

After the war Howard entered the Diplomatic Service and served in Christiania (now Oslo), Bucharest, Rome and Sofia. He was Chargé d'Affaires at Madrid 1946–1949; Ambassador to Uruguay 1949–53; and finally Minister to the Holy See 1953–57.

Howard was appointed CMG in 1944 and knighted KCMG in 1953.

Diplomatic posts
Preceded by Sir Walter Roberts	Envoy Extraordinary and Minister Plenipotentiary to the Holy See; 1953 – 1957	Succeeded by Sir Marcus Cheke
