= Marcus Cheke =

British diplomat and courtier

Sir Marcus John Cheke KCVO CMG (20 October 1906 – 22 June 1960) was a British diplomat and courtier.

== Career ==
Marcus Cheke was educated at Clayesmore School and Trinity College, Oxford. In the British general election of 1929 he stood as Liberal candidate for the New Forest and Christchurch constituency but was defeated by the sitting MP, Wilfrid Ashley.

Cheke was Honorary Attaché at the British Embassy, Lisbon, 1931–34 and at Brussels 1934–37; Press Attaché, Lisbon, 1938–42; attached to the staff of the Lisbon Embassy with the local rank of First Secretary 1942–45; and Vice-Marshal of the Diplomatic Corps 1946–57. He was appointed Minister to the Holy See in 1957 and died in office in Rome in 1960. He was also an Extra Gentleman Usher to the Queen from 1957.

Cheke was appointed CVO in 1952, CMG in 1955 and knighted KCVO in 1957.

== Personal ==
In 1939 Cheke married the Honourable Constance Elizabeth Lopes, daughter of the 1st Baron Roborough. They had no children.

In 1945, when leaving Lisbon, Cheke donated a painting to the Câmara Municipal (city council), by him, depicting the Terreiro do Paço.

== Publications ==
- Papillée, Faber & Gwyer, London, 1927
- The licking [Reminiscences of the author's childhood], Grayhound Press, Winchester, 1931
- Hide and Seek, Collins, London, 1934
- A tale of Lisbon [A poem], The Shakespeare Head Press, Oxford, 1937
- Dictator of Portugal: A Life of the Marquis of Pombal, 1699–1782, Sidgwick & Jackson, London, 1938
- Acta n.º 99, Câmara Municipal de Lisboa, 1945
- Carlota Joaquina, Queen of Portugal, Sidgwick & Jackson, London, 1947
- Guidance on Foreign Usages and Ceremony, and Other Matters, for a Member of His Majesty's Foreign Service on His First Appointment to a Post Abroad, HM Diplomatic Corps, London, 1949
- The Cardinal de Bernis, Cassell, London, 1958

Diplomatic posts
Preceded by Sir Douglas Howard	Envoy Extraordinary and Minister Plenipotentiary to the Holy See; 1957 – 1960	Succeeded by Sir Peter Scarlett
