= D'Arcy Osborne, 12th Duke of Leeds =

British diplomat (1884–1964)

His Grace The Duke of Leeds KCMG

British Minister to the Holy See
- In office 1936–1947
- Preceded by: Sir Charles Wingfield
- Succeeded by: Sir Victor Perowne

Personal details
- Born: Francis D'Arcy Godolphin Osborne; 16 September 1884
- Died: 20 March 1964 (aged 79)
- Relations: Lord Sydney Godolphin Osborne (grandfather)
- Parent(s): Sidney Francis Godolphin Osborne; Margaret Dulcibella Hammersley
- Education: Haileybury College
- Occupation: Diplomat

Ancestral arms of the Osborne family, Dukes of Leeds

Francis D'Arcy Godolphin Osborne, 12th Duke of Leeds, KCMG (16 September 1884 – 20 March 1964), known between 1943 and 1963 as Sir D'Arcy Osborne, was a British diplomat.

== Early life and career ==
Osborne was the eldest son of Sidney Francis Godolphin Osborne and of Margaret Dulcibella, née Hammersley. Through his father, he was the great-great-grandson of Francis Osborne, 5th Duke of Leeds, Foreign Secretary between 1783 and 1791.

The senior line of the Dukes of Leeds (through the 5th Duke's eldest son, the 6th Duke) had become extinct in 1859 on the death of the 7th Duke, and the title had passed to a junior line descended from Osborne's great-grandfather (second son of the 5th Duke), the 1st Baron Godolphin. When Osborne was born, the title was held by his first cousin once removed the 9th Duke, and Osborne was eleventh in line to succeed. However, various deaths moved him steadily up the line of succession and in 1927 he became heir presumptive to his second cousin once removed (sixteen years his junior) the 11th Duke (who subsequently married three times, but had no sons to displace Osborne's position as heir).

He was educated at Haileybury College, before joining HM Diplomatic Service. In about 1919 or 1920, Osborne met Lady Elizabeth Bowes-Lyon, the future Queen Elizabeth, with whom he maintained a life-long friendship and correspondence. He later described her as "the past love of his life".

Osborne was posted to Rome (1909–1913), Washington D.C., The Hague, Lisbon (Counsellor, 1928–1929) and Rome (Counsellor, 1929–1931). He then served as British Minister in Washington, the deputy head of the British mission to the United States, from 1931 to 1935.

== Minister to the Holy See ==
Osborne was Envoy Extraordinary and Minister Plenipotentiary to the Holy See 1936–1947. His appointment came on the heels of Cardinal Secretary of State Pacelli's (future Pope Pius XII) complaints regarding the short tenure of holders of the post; in fact, Osborne himself waited six months after his appointment before arriving in Rome.

When Italy declared war on the United Kingdom in 1940, Osborne, accredited to the Holy See but living in Italian territory, moved inside the Vatican according to arrangements made under the Lateran Treaty. With a few exceptions, Osborne would be immured inside the Vatican until the liberation of Rome in 1944, working under difficult conditions from a pilgrim hostel attached to the Convent of Santa Marta.

Using the code name "Mount", he was one of the group, which he supported with his own money, led by Monsignor Hugh O'Flaherty and a French diplomat François de Vial who helped conceal some 4,000 escapees, whether Jews or Allied soldiers, from the Nazis: 3,925 survived the war. Their story was portrayed in the 1983 film The Scarlet and the Black, starring Gregory Peck as O'Flaherty. He also played a key part in a plot in 1940, which involved the Pope and certain German generals, to overthrow Hitler. Major Sam Derry, in his book The Rome Escape Line, described meeting Sir D'Arcy in the Vatican in 1943:

Unruffled poise... Seldom have I met any man in whom I had such immediate confidence. He welcomed us warmly, yet I found it impossible to behave with anything but strict formality. Apart from the restraining influence of my clothing [he was disguised as a monsignor] I was almost overwhelmed by an atmosphere of old-world English courtliness and grace which I had thought belonged only to the country-house parties of long ago. Sir D'Arcy was spry, trim, a young sixty, but he had spent years enough in the diplomatic service to develop an astonishing aptitude for creating around himself an aura of all that was most civilized in English life. I felt as though I had returned home after long travels, to find that royalty had come to dinner, and I had to be on my best behaviour.

Following this dinner, Sir D'Arcy offered Derry the command of the escape organisation.

== Later life and death ==
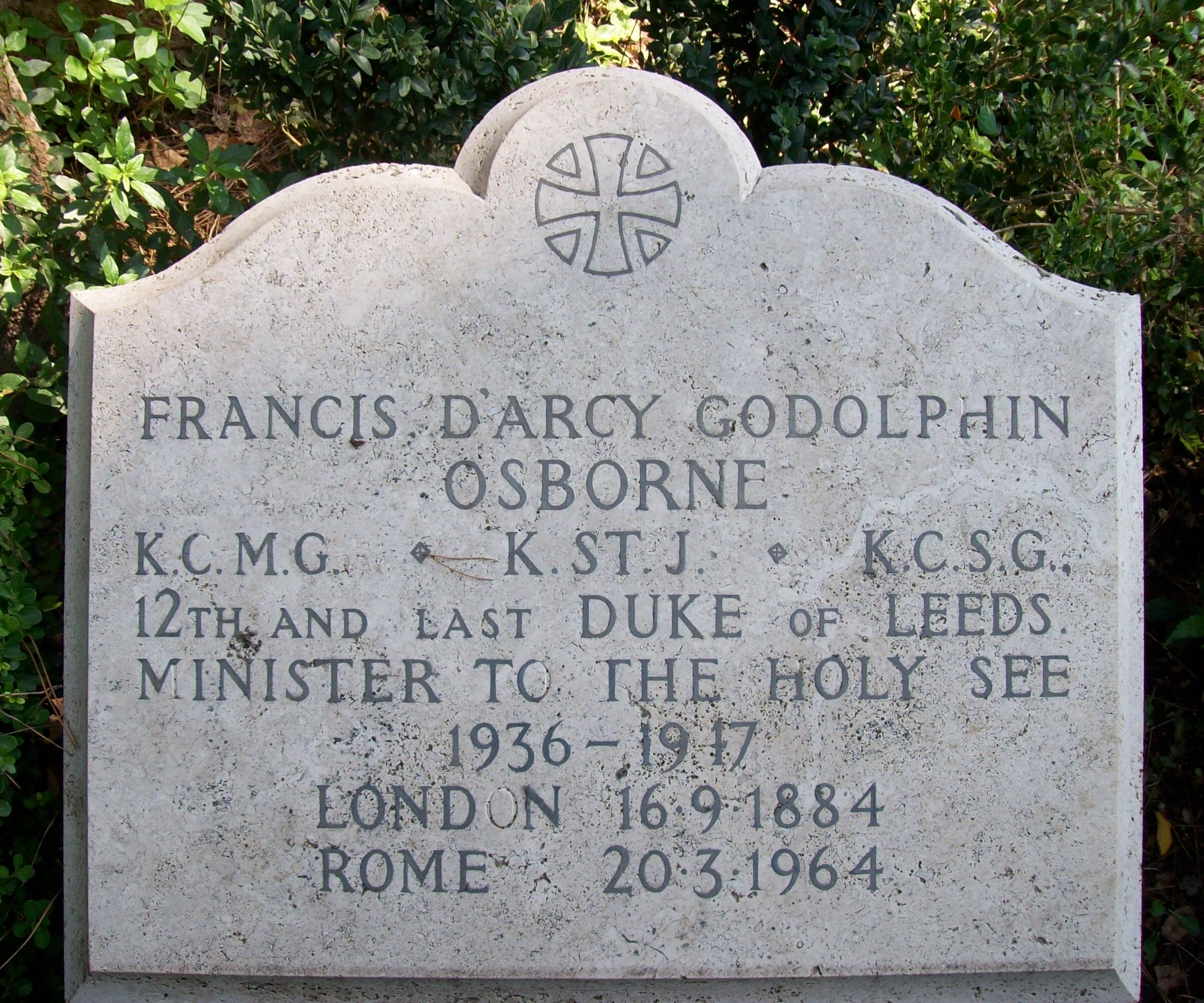
Protestant Cemetery, Rome, grave of the 12th Duke of Leeds

After the war, Osborne retired from the Diplomatic Service and settled in Italy, living at the Palazzo Sacchetti, 66 Via Giulia, Rome. With the future Pope Paul VI, whom he had befriended during the war, he founded an industrial school for the poor boys of Rome. He was visited by the Queen and the Queen Mother on several occasions. His financial situation remained precarious, and in 1962 a group of friends, including the Queen Mother, arranged a sum of money for his relief.

On several occasions after the war, he wrote in defence of Pius XII's wartime record, which had come under attack.

Osborne succeeded his second cousin once removed as the Duke of Leeds on 26 July 1963. He died just a year later on 20 March 1964, at the age of seventy-nine, at which point the dukedom and all of its subsidiary titles became extinct. Pope Paul VI, who had sent his personal chamberlain to visit Osborne's residence daily during his final illness, expressed his condolences, as did Cardinal Cicognani, the papal Secretary of State.

The Duke of Leeds was buried in the Protestant Cemetery, Rome, on 24 March 1964. Sir Peter Scarlett, British Minister to the Holy See, represented the Queen at the funeral, and the British Ambassador to Italy, Sir John Ward, represented the Queen Mother.

== Honours ==
Osborne was appointed a Companion of the Order of St Michael and St George (CMG) in the 1930 New Year Honours, and promoted to Knight Commander (KCMG) in the 1943 Birthday Honours, receiving the knighthood on his only trip to the United Kingdom during the Second World War, which required special Italian permission. He was also a Knight of Grace of the Order of Saint John (KStJ) and Knight Commander of the Order of St. Gregory the Great (KCSG).

== Legacy ==
Osborne kept an extensive diary, portions of which were used by Owen Chadwick as the basis of his 1980 Ford Lectures and his 1988 book, Britain and the Vatican during the Second World War. Chadwick's quotations from Osborne's diary included: "I reached the grave conclusion during the Mass that I am nothing but a pencilled marginal note in the Book of Life. I am not in the main text at all." The diary is in the collections of the British Library.

Peerage of England
| Preceded by John Osborne | Duke of Leeds; 1963–1964 | Extinct |
