= Robert Clive (diplomat) =

British diplomat

The Right Honourable Sir Robert Clive GCMG

British Ambassador to Belgium and Minister to Luxembourg
- In office 1937–1939
- Monarch: George VI
- Prime Minister: Neville Chamberlain
- Preceded by: Sir Esmond Ovey
- Succeeded by: Sir Lancelot Oliphant (as Ambassador to Belgium); Nigel Watson (as Chargé d'affaires to Luxembourg)

British Ambassador to Japan
- In office 1934–1937
- Monarchs: George V Edward VIII; George VI
- Prime Minister: Ramsay MacDonald; Stanley Baldwin
- Preceded by: Sir Francis Oswald Lindley
- Succeeded by: Sir Robert Craigie

Personal details
- Born: 23 December 1877
- Died: 13 May 1948 (aged 70)
- Children: 3
- Relatives: William Feilding, 7th Earl of Denbigh (grandfather); Edward Clive (great-grandfather)
- Education: Haileybury College
- Alma mater: Magdalen College, Oxford
- Occupation: Diplomat

Sir Robert Henry Clive GCMG PC (23 December 1877 – 13 May 1948) was a British diplomat.

== Early life ==
Clive was the son of Charles Meysey Bolton Clive and the great-grandson of Edward Clive. His mother was Lady Kathleen Elizabeth Mary Julia, daughter of William Feilding, 7th Earl of Denbigh. He was educated at Haileybury College and Magdalen College, Oxford.

== Career ==
Clive entered the Diplomatic Service in 1902. He was General-Consul for Bavaria between 1923 and 1924 and for Morocco between 1924 and 1926 and Envoy Extraordinary and Minister Plenipotentiary to Persia between 1926 and 1931 and to the Holy See between 1933 and 1934.

In 1934 he was appointed British Ambassador to Japan, a post he held until 1937.

Clive served as British Ambassador to Belgium between 1937 and 1939.

Clive was appointed a Commander of the Order of St Michael and St George (CMG) in the 1919 Birthday Honours, while he was First Secretary in Stockholm, promoted to Knight Commander of the order (KCMG) in the 1927 New Year Honours and again to Knight Grand Cross of the order (GCMG) in the 1936 New Year Honours. He was sworn of the Privy Council in 1934 and He retired from the Diplomatic Service in 1939.

== Personal life ==
In 1905, Clive married the Honourable Magdalen, daughter of Kenneth Muir Mackenzie, 1st Baron Muir-Mackenzie. They had two sons and one daughter.

Clive died in May 1948, aged 70. Lady Clive died in October 1971, aged 87.

== See also ==
- List of diplomats from the United Kingdom to Iran
- List of Ambassadors from the United Kingdom to the Holy See
- List of Ambassadors from the United Kingdom to Japan
- List of Ambassadors from the United Kingdom to Belgium
- Anglo-Japanese relations

== Notes ==
Diplomatic posts
Preceded by Sir Percy Loraine, Bt	Envoy Extraordinary and Minister Plenipotentiary to Persia; 1926–1931	Succeeded by Sir Reginald Hoare
Preceded by Sir Ivone Kirkpatrick (Chargé d'Affaires)	Envoy Extraordinary and Minister Plenipotentiary to the Holy See; 1933–1934	Succeeded by Sir Charles Wingfield
Preceded by Sir Francis Lindley	British Ambassador to Japan; 1934–1937	Succeeded by Sir Robert Craigie
Preceded by Sir Esmond Ovey	British Ambassador to Belgium; 1937–1939	Succeeded by Sir Lancelot Oliphant
