= Thomas Edward Rogers =

British diplomat (1912–1999)

- Born: 28 December 1912
- Died: 26 November 1999 (aged 86)
- Occupation: British diplomat

This article is not about British diplomat Edward Thomas Rogers (1831–1884)

Thomas Edward Rogers CMG MBE (28 December 1912 – 26 November 1999) was a British diplomat.

== Biography ==
Born on 28 December 1912, Thomas Rogers was educated at Bedford School and at Emmanuel College, Cambridge. He served in the Indian Civil Service between 1936 and 1947, entering the British Diplomatic Service in 1948. He was British Ambassador to Colombia between 1970 and 1973.

In 1991, Rogers published his memoirs under the title Great Game, Grand Game: Memoirs of India, the Gulf & Diplomacy.

Rogers died on 26 November 1999.

Diplomatic posts
Preceded by William Hilary Young	Ambassador from the United Kingdom to Colombia; 1970 – 1973	Succeeded by Geoffrey Allan Crossley
