= Michael S. Williams =

British diplomat (1911–1984)

Sir Michael Sanigear Williams, KCMG (17 August 1911 – 25 February 1984) was a British diplomat.

Michael Williams was educated at Rugby School and Trinity College, Cambridge. He entered the Foreign Office in 1935 and served in the British embassies at Madrid, Rome, and Rio de Janeiro besides posts in London.

Williams was Minister at Bonn 1956–60; Minister to Guatemala 1960–62 and Ambassador to Guatemala 1962–63; Assistant Under-Secretary of State, Foreign Office, 1963–65; and finally Envoy Extraordinary and Minister Plenipotentiary to the Holy See 1965–70.

Williams was appointed CMG in 1954 and knighted KCMG in 1968.

== See also ==
- British Ambassadors to the Holy See

Diplomatic posts
Preceded by Sir Peter W.S.Y. Scarlett	Envoy Extraordinary and Minister Plenipotentiary to the Holy See; 1965 – 1970	Succeeded by Desmond Crawley
