= Godefroy de Blonay =

Swiss member of the IOC (1869–1937)

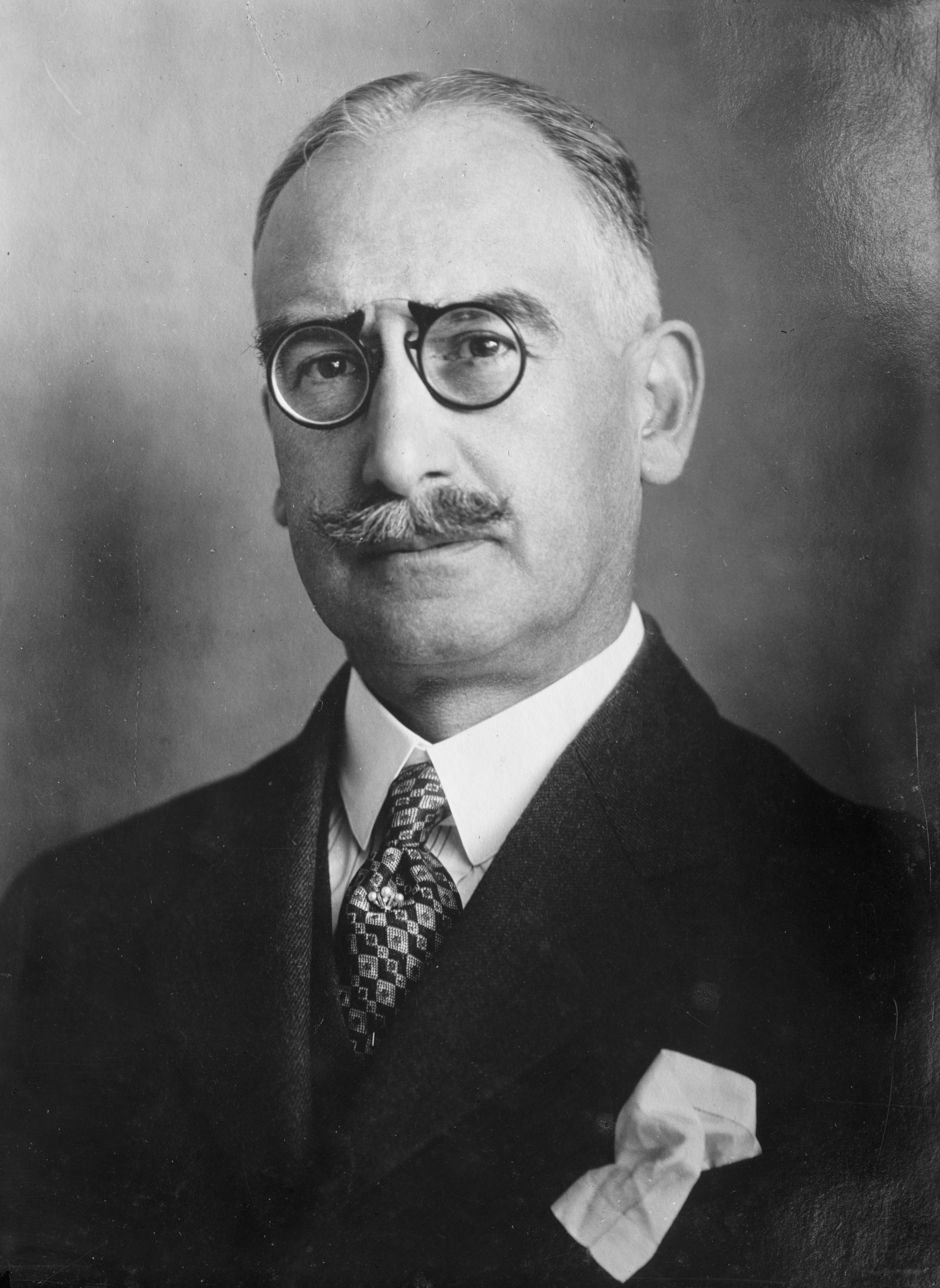

Acting President of the International Olympic Committee
- In office 1916–1919
- Preceded by: Pierre de Coubertin
- Succeeded by: Pierre de Coubertin

Personal details
- Born: Godefroy Jean Henri Louis de Blonay; 25 July 1869; Niederschöntal, Switzerland
- Died: 14 February 1937 (aged 67); Biskra, French Algeria
- Spouse: Elisabeth Sophie de Salis (m. 1901)
- Children: 4
- Occupation: Businessman; sports administrator

Godefroy Jean Henri Louis de Blonay (25 July 1869 – 14 February 1937) was a Swiss sports administrator who was an early member of the International Olympic Committee.

== Career ==
From 1899, de Blonay was the first Swiss member on the International Olympic Committee (IOC). He remained on the committee for 38 years, until his death in 1937, being the 24th on the roll of members since 1894 (since the creation of IOC) ; Pierre de Coubertin being number one. In 1912, de Blonay was one of the founders of the Swiss Olympic Association and for the first three years (until 1915), he was also the association's first president.

De Blonay was, for a time, one of the closest confidants of the IOC's second president Pierre de Coubertin. When de Coubertin joined the French Army in 1916, de Blonay became the acting president of the IOC. Earlier, when de Coubertin had nearly run out of money and took a back seat, de Blonay had been appointed to run an International Olympic executive committee, in lieu of the president. However, it has been suggested that he upset de Coubertin by over-stretching the powers of this committee and this may have resulted in his failure to succeed de Coubertin as the third IOC president in 1925.

== Wife and family ==
He married Elisabeth Sophie de Salis (Neuchâtel, 21 May 1880 – 30 March 1967) in Neuchâtel on 24 September 1901. She was the only surviving child of Count Peter de Salis (second son of Peter, 5th Count de Salis-Soglio) by his second wife Agnes Louisa La Trobe (died 5 May 1916), daughter of Governor Charles La Trobe, CB, by his wife Sophie de Montmollin.

They had four children and lived at the château de Grandson, Vaud, near Yverdon-les-Bains, Switzerland.
