= Maureen MacGlashan =

British diplomat

Maureen Elizabeth MacGlashan, CMG was Assistant Director of the Lauterpacht Centre for International Law from 1986–1990 and is now a Fellow of the Centre.

From 1963 to 1998, she was a member of the British Diplomatic Service. She served in, among other places, such hot spots as Israel, Eastern Europe, and Northern Ireland. Her final Diplomatic position was as British Ambassador to the Holy See (1995–1998), the first woman to fill that post.

Since her time as Assistant Director of the Lauterpacht Centre, she has been responsible for the indexing of a number of the Centre's publications including the ILR, Iran-US Claims Tribunal Reports, ICSID Reports and the International Environmental Law Reports. She also indexes a number of non-Centre publications, and occasionally translates (e.g. Prosper Weil's The Law of Maritime Delimitation for the University of Cambridge). She was editor of The Indexer, the international journal of indexing, from 2004 to 2018.

MacGlashan studied at Girton College, Cambridge.

== See also ==
- British Ambassadors to the Holy See
