= Victor Perowne =

British diplomat

Sir John Victor Thomas Woolrych Tait Perowne KCMG KStJ FSA (30 July 1897 – 8 January 1951) was a British diplomat.

== Career ==
The son of Edith Marione (née Browne) and John Thomas Woolrych Perowne who married in 1896, John Victor Thomas Woolrych Tait Perowne was educated at Eton College and Corpus Christi College, Cambridge. He served in the Scots Guards 1916–18 with the rank of lieutenant, and contributed a poem "A Dirge" to The Muse in Arms, an anthology of British war poetry.

Perowne joined the Diplomatic Service and served in Madrid, Lisbon, Copenhagen and Paris as well as posts in the Foreign Office before being appointed Envoy Extraordinary and Minister Plenipotentiary to the Holy See in 1947. He died in office in Rome in 1951.

Victor Perowne was appointed CMG in 1944 and knighted KCMG in 1950.

== Personal life ==
Victor Perowne listed his recreations in Who's Who as "Art, music, literature". He married the Hon. Agatha Beaumont, youngest daughter of Wentworth Beaumont, 1st Viscount Allendale, in 1933; they had one son, John Florian Canning (1942–2000), and one daughter, Rachel Penelope (1938–1940).

== See also ==
- British Ambassadors to the Holy See

Diplomatic posts
Preceded by Sir D'Arcy Osborne	Envoy Extraordinary and Minister Plenipotentiary to the Holy See; 1947–1951	Succeeded by Sir Walter Roberts
