= Mark Heath =

British diplomat (1927–2005)

Sir Mark Evelyn Heath

United Kingdom Ambassador to the Holy See
- In office 1982–1985
- Succeeded by: David Lane

Personal details
- Born: 27 May 1927 England
- Died: 28 September 2005 (aged 78) Bath, United Kingdom
- Spouse: Margaret Bragg
- Relations: Lawrence Bragg (father-in-law)
- Children: Nicholas (b. 1956), Clare (b. 1957), William (b. 1959)
- Education: Queens' College, Cambridge

Sir Mark Evelyn Heath KCVO CMG (27 May 1927 – 28 September 2005) was a British diplomat who served as British Envoy Extraordinary and Minister Plenipotentiary to the Holy See from 1980 to 1982 and the first Ambassador to the Holy See from 1982 to 1985. His appointment represented the resumption of full diplomatic relations between Britain and the Holy See for the first time since 1534.

== Career ==
Heath was born at Emsworth, Hampshire, the son of Commander John Moore Heath and Hilary Heath (née Salter). He was the great-great-great-grandson of James Heath, the eighteenth-century engraver and associate member of the Royal Academy. Heath was educated first at Marlborough College and then at Queens' College, Cambridge, where he read history. During World War II he served on minesweepers with the RNVR. He joined the Foreign Office in 1950.

In 1962, he was appointed as British Consul to Bulgaria. While there, his considerable height (he stood 6 ft 8in tall) caused the visiting Soviet premiere, Nikita Khrushchev to embrace him and remark that he would have made a fine Communist. Sir Mark was Head of the Commodities Department from 1970 to 1971. He served as Counsellor with the OECD from 1971 to 1974, and then as the Head of the West African Department at the Foreign and Commonwealth Office from 1975 to 1978. He also held postings in Indonesia, Denmark, Canada and France.

From 1980 to 1985, he served as the United Kingdom's diplomatic representative to the Holy See, first as minister plenipotentiary and then from 1982 as ambassador. Heath's appointment represented the resumption of full diplomatic relations between Britain and the Holy See for the first time since Henry VIII's break with the Catholic Church in 1534. He was involved in the negotiations surrounding the historic 1982 visit of Pope John Paul II to Britain, a trip which was almost cancelled because of the conflict between Britain and predominantly Catholic Argentina.

After retiring from the Diplomatic Service he was Head of Protocol for the Hong Kong Government (1985–88).

He was made a Companion of the Order of St Michael and St George (CMG) in the 1980 Birthday Honours, then was knighted as a Knight Commander of the Royal Victorian Order (KCVO) the same year.

A committed Anglican, during his retirement he served as a steward at Bath Abbey.

In 1954 he married Margaret, daughter of Nobel-laureate Lawrence Bragg, by whom he had a daughter and two sons. He died in 2005. Lady Heath died in 2022.

== See also ==
- British Ambassadors to the Holy See
