= Eskadale =

Coordinates: 57.4230796°N 4.5856296°W

Eskadale: Scottish Gaelic: Eisgeadal
- Location within the Inverness area
- Population: 159
- Council area: Highland
- Country: Scotland
- Sovereign state: United Kingdom
- Post town: Beauly
- Postcode district: IV4 7
- Police: Scotland
- Fire: Scottish
- Ambulance: Scottish
- UK Parliament: Caithness, Sutherland and Easter Ross
- Scottish Parliament: Skye, Lochaber and Badenoch

Eskadale (Scottish Gaelic: Eisgeadal) is a small hamlet in the Highland council area of Scotland. It is situated on the south bank of the River Beauly, 3.6 miles (5.8 km) west of the village of Kiltarlity and 13.5 miles (21.8 km) southwest of Inverness.

The name Eskadale derives from the Old Norse Askrdalr, meaning "Valley of the Ash-trees". This name may have been used by Viking settlers in Scotland to apply to Strathglass as a whole, and is one of few placenames in the area with clear Norse origins.

In the past, Eskadale was divided into two smaller hamlets, Easter and Wester Eskadale. There was also a ferry service operating from the village, still existent in the mid-19th century, and crossing the River Beauly to Aigas.

Eskadale is the site of St. Mary's Church, a large chapel and one of few Roman Catholic churches in the Scottish Highlands. It was erected by Thomas Fraser, 12th Lord Lovat, with a family graveyard constructed nearby. The church is currently undergoing major repairs.

Eskadale House is a large Georgian era mansion, built on the shore of the River Beauly in the 1700s. Originally owned by Clan Fraser of Lovat, it was acquired by the Quattlebaum family of South Carolina in the mid-1980s.

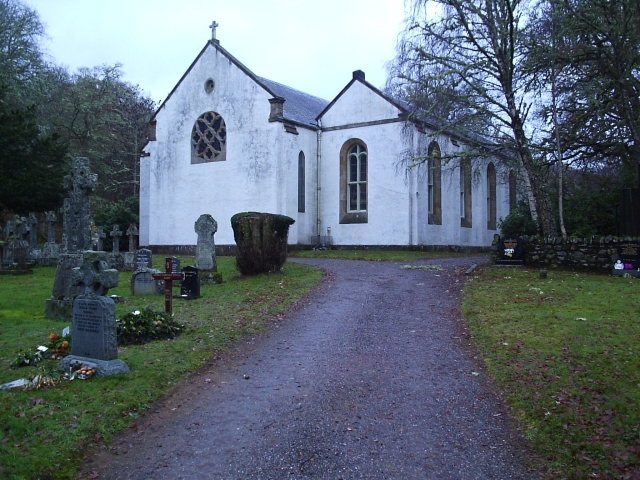
St. Mary's Church, located at the hamlet's west end

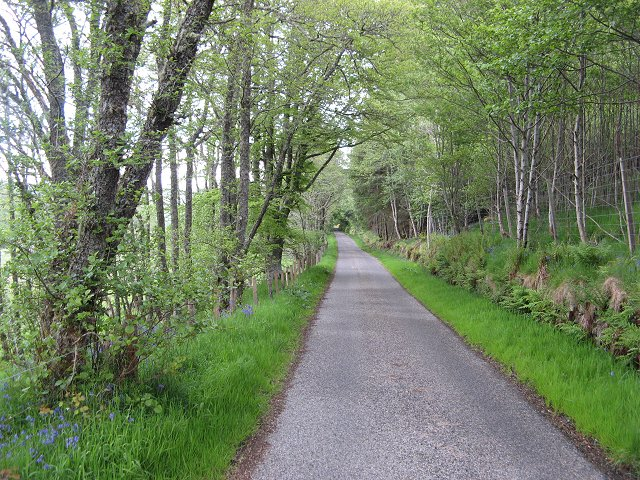
The single-track road running to and from Eskadale

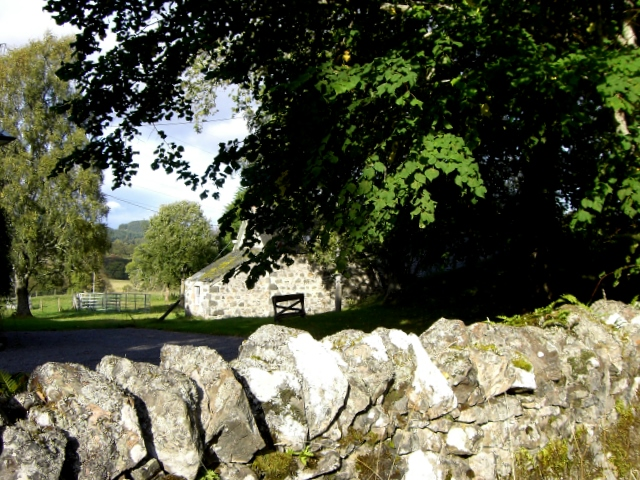
A local barn, amongst the hamlet's fertile pastures
