= John Francis William, 6th Count de Salis-Soglio =

British diplomat

John Francis William
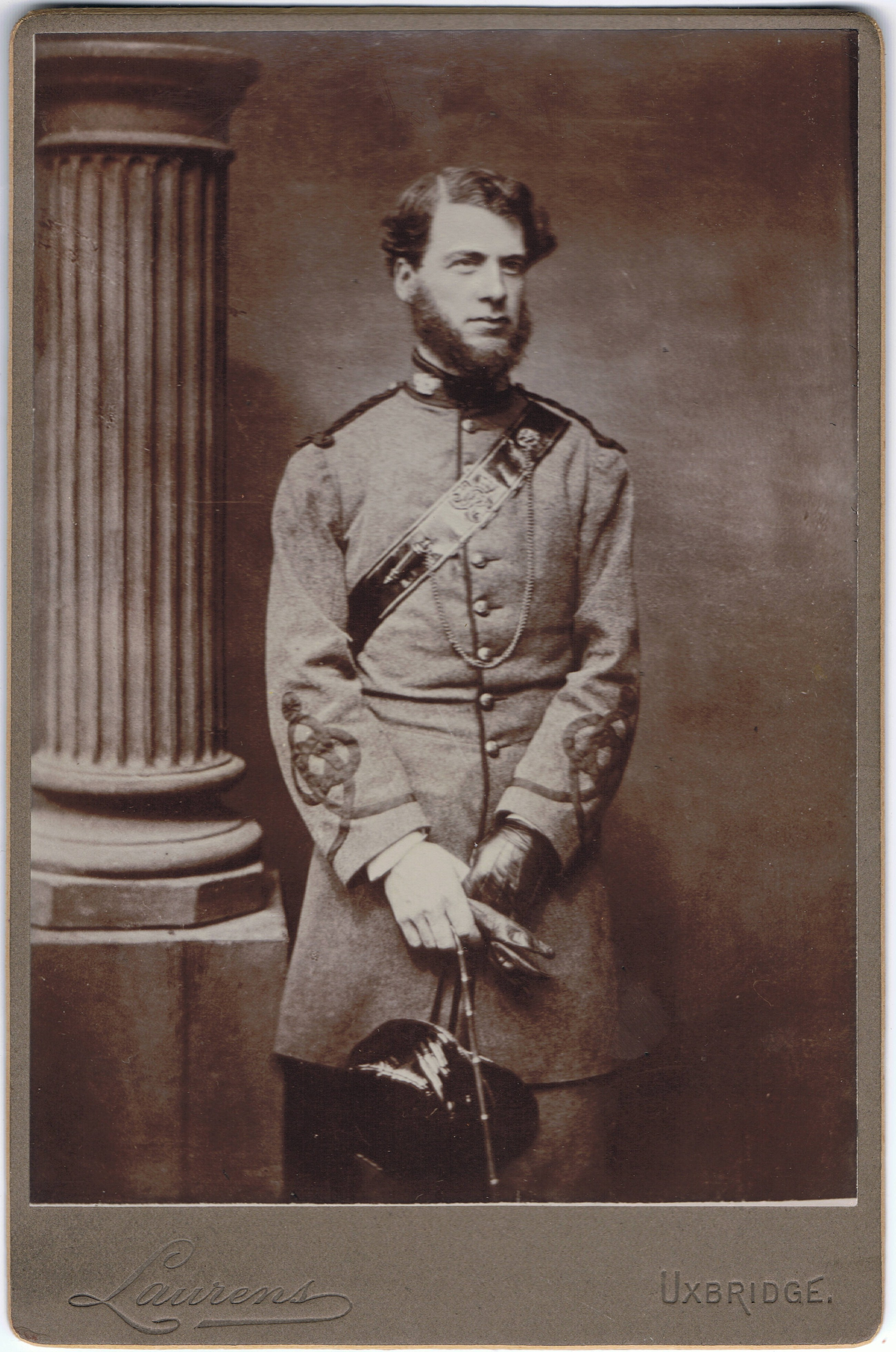
- Born: August 25, 1825; Neuchâtel, Switzerland
- Died: August 7, 1871 (aged 45); Hillingdon, London, England

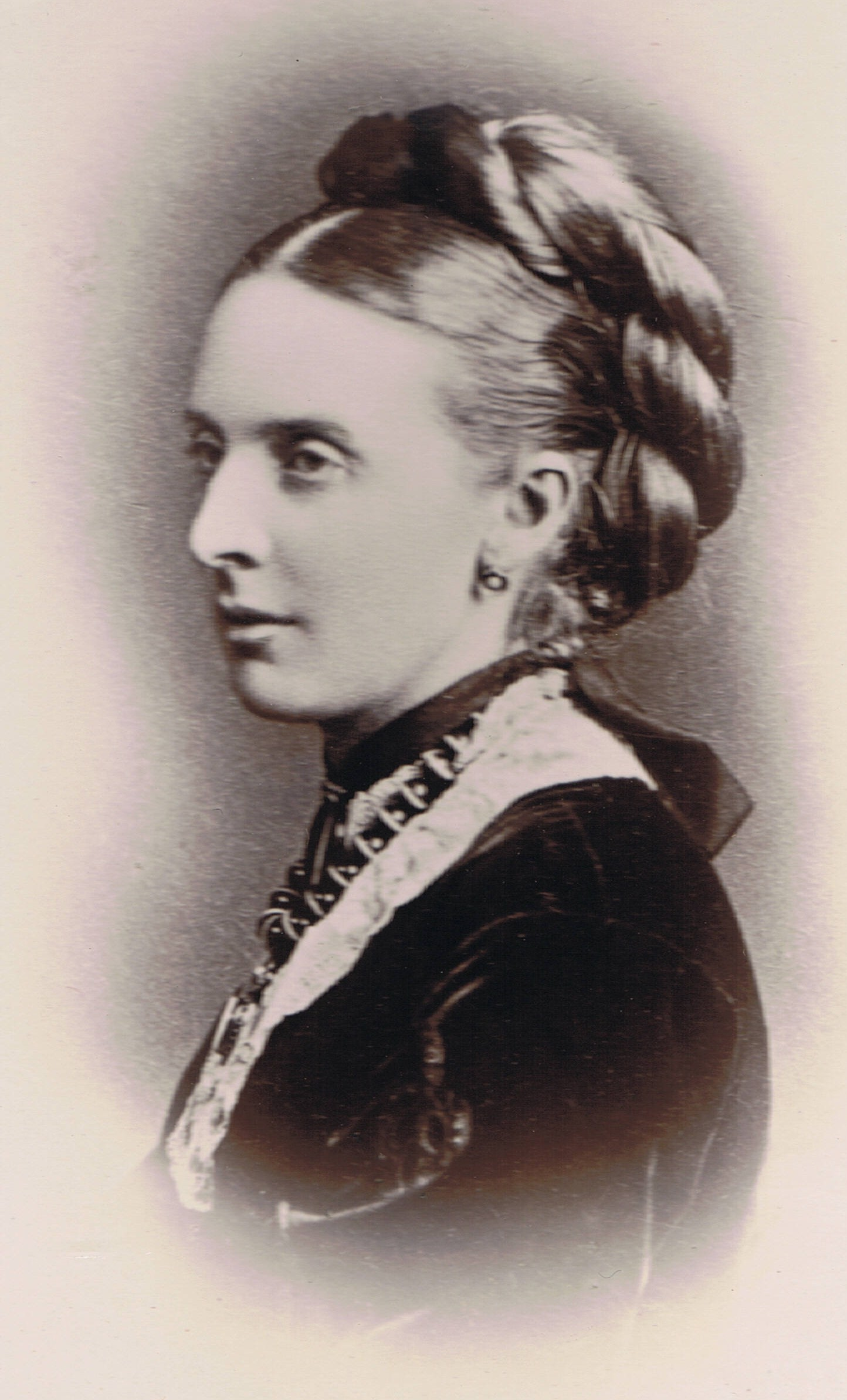
Amelia Frances Harriet, Countess de Salis

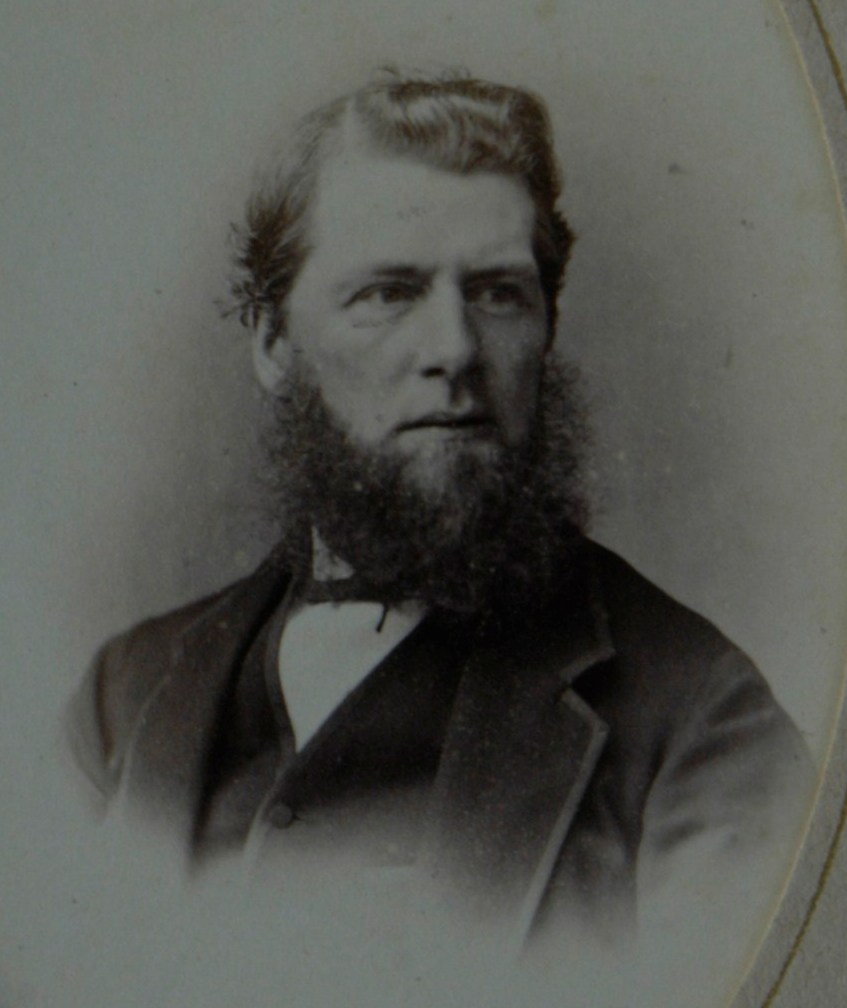
Count de Salis, 1869

John Francis William de Salis, 6th Count de Salis (25 August 1825 – 7 August 1871) was a British diplomat that held the title of Count de Salis-Soglio.

== Life ==
He was the eldest son of Count Peter John de Salis by his second wife Cecile Henrietta Marguerite, daughter of David Bourgeoise of Neuchâtel.

After some education in London (Harrow) he was an attaché in Turin (October 1845-December 1849). Lived at Hillingdon. He was a JP for Middlesex. In 1860 he was commissioned into the 24th Middlesex Volunteer Rifle Corps. He was promoted lieutenant later that year and captain in 1861.

A renowned numismatist, he is recorded on a large board as one of the British Museum's major benefactors. John Warren, 3rd Baron De Tabley was a first cousin, and William Fane De Salis an uncle.

He married (Iver, 1 February 1862) Amelia Frances Harriet, daughter of Christopher Tower, JP DL MP, of Huntsmoor Park, Iver and Weald Hall, Essex, by his wife Lady Sophia Cust, eldest daughter of the first Earl Brownlow.

In 1881 Burke's records the Countess at 7, Athlestone Terrace, Cromwell Road, London (where she died in 1885), and as at Grange Hill, Kilmallock, Ireland.

== Children ==
Catherine Sophia (Katie) (29.1.1863-), John Francis Charles (1864-) and Henry Rodolph (Rudie) (1866-).

John Francis de Salis and his wife and children, 1866–69

Regnal titles
Preceded by Peter John, Count de Salis	Count de Salis-Soglio; 1870–1871	Succeeded by John Francis Charles, 7th Count de Salis
