= Andrew Palmer (diplomat) =

British diplomat (1937–2019)

Andrew Eustace Palmer, CMG, CVO (30 September 1937 - 13 November 2019) was a British diplomat, and Her Britannic Majesty's Ambassador to the Holy See 1991–1995.

He was educated at Winchester College and the University of Cambridge. He also attended the Royal College of Defence Studies, and Harvard University. He was married to Davina (Barclay) from 1962.

Palmer joined the Diplomatic Service in 1961. He was Ambassador to Cuba 1986–1988, and Private Secretary to the Duke and Duchess of Kent 1988–1990. He retired from the Diplomatic Service in 1995. He then held a number of positions at the University of Reading, where he was awarded the Degree of Hon D Litt in March 2016.

He died on 13 November 2019 at the age of 82. A service of thanksgiving for his life was held in St. Barnabas' Church, Peasemore, Berkshire on 9 December 2019.

== See also ==
- British Ambassadors to the Holy See
