= Walford Selby =

British civil servant and diplomat (1881–1965)

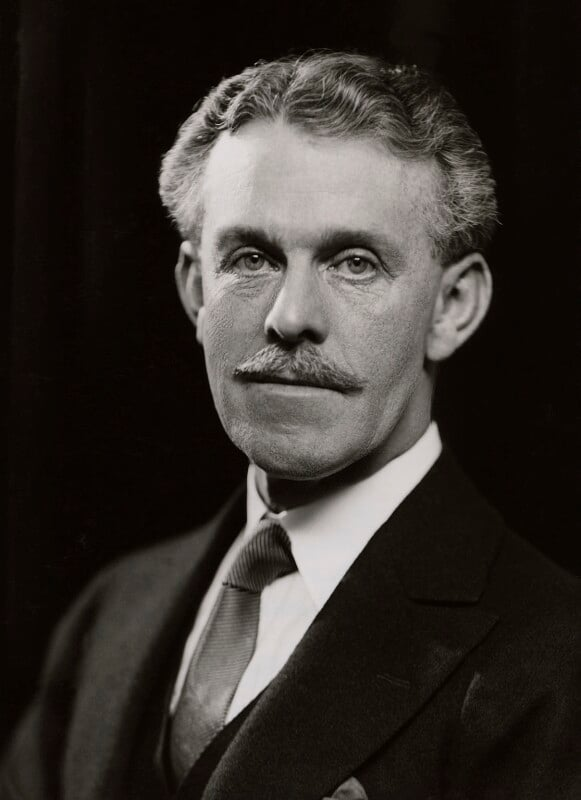
Selby in 1936

Sir Walford Harmood Montague Selby KCMG CB CVO (19 May 1881 – 7 August 1965) was a British civil servant and diplomat.

== Career ==
Selby was educated at Charterhouse School and Christ Church, Oxford, and joined the Diplomatic Service in 1904 as an attaché. He served in Berlin and The Hague where he was on the Secretariat of the Peace Conference in 1907. He returned to the Foreign Office in London in 1908. He was on the staff of Lord Rosebery when he made a special visit to Vienna to announce the accession of King George V in 1910. After that Selby was secretary to the committee preparing for George V's coronation, and was a Gold Staff Officer (assistant to the Earl Marshal) at the actual coronation in 1911. He was assistant private secretary to Sir Edward Grey, the Foreign Secretary, 1911–15, and private secretary to Lord Robert Cecil, Parliamentary Under-Secretary of State for Foreign Affairs, 1915–18. He wanted to join the army but the Foreign Office would not release him until 1918 when he was able to join the Grenadier Guards shortly before the war ended. He then returned to the Foreign Office and was First Secretary in the High Commission at Cairo 1919–22; Principal Private Secretary to the Foreign Secretary 1924–32; envoy to Austria 1933–37; and ambassador to Portugal 1937–40.

== Honours ==
Walford Selby was appointed MVO in 1911 and raised to CVO in 1924. He was appointed CB in the New Year Honours of 1926 and knighted KCMG in the King's Birthday Honours of 1931.

== Publications ==
- Diplomatic Twilight: 1930–1940, Murray, 1953

Diplomatic posts
Preceded by Robert Vansittart	Principal Private Secretary to the Foreign Secretary; 1924–1932	Succeeded by Horace Seymour
Preceded by Sir Eric Phipps	Envoy Extraordinary and Minister Plenipotentiary to the Republic of Austria; 1933–1937	Succeeded by Michael Palairet
Preceded by Sir Charles Wingfield	Ambassador Extraordinary and Plenipotentiary to the Portuguese Republic; 1937–1940	Succeeded by Sir Ronald Campbell
