= Peter, 5th Count de Salis-Soglio =

Peter John Fane de Salis, 5th Count de Salis-Soglio (1799–1870).

Peter John Fane de Salis, (5th) Count de Salis-Soglio, Count of the Holy Roman Empire, DL, JP, G.C.J.J., K.R.E. (26 February 1799 – 24 December 1870) was a mercenary soldier and landowner in Middlesex and the Irish counties Limerick and Armagh. He was Bailiff of the English Venerable Order of Saint John of Jerusalem and Grand Prior of the Irish one. He was also an hereditary Knight of the Golden Spur/Eques Auratus and Papal Count Palatine of the Lateran.

Petrus Johannes, Pierre Jean, was born in Marylebone, Westminster 26 February 1799 and died at Acton 24 December 1870 (age 71). Eldest son of Jerome, Count de Salis by his first wife Sophia Drake. William Fane de Salis was a younger half-brother.

== Wives and Children ==
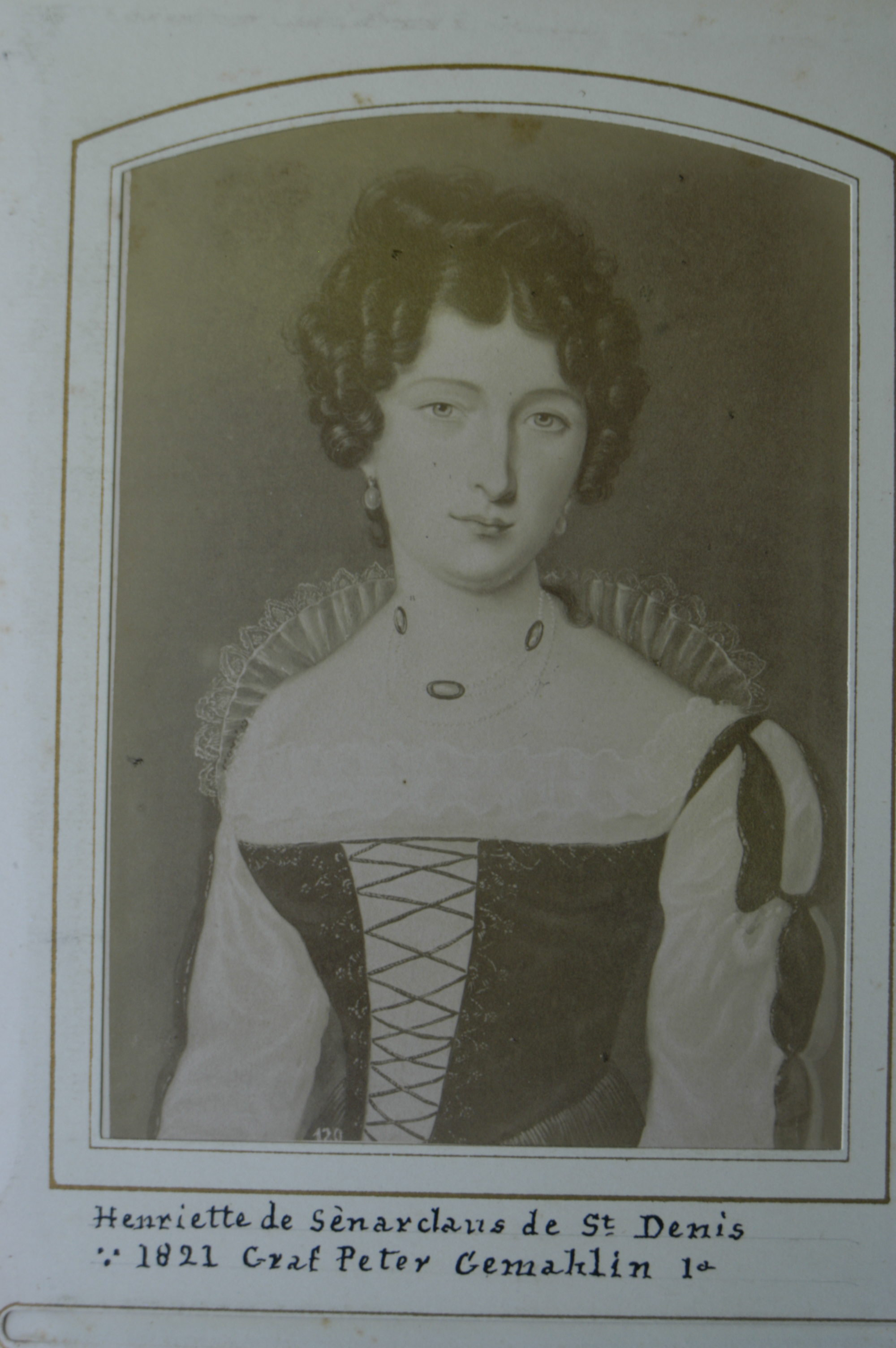
First wife: Henriette Charlotte de Senarclens de St. Denys de Grancy (1797–1822).

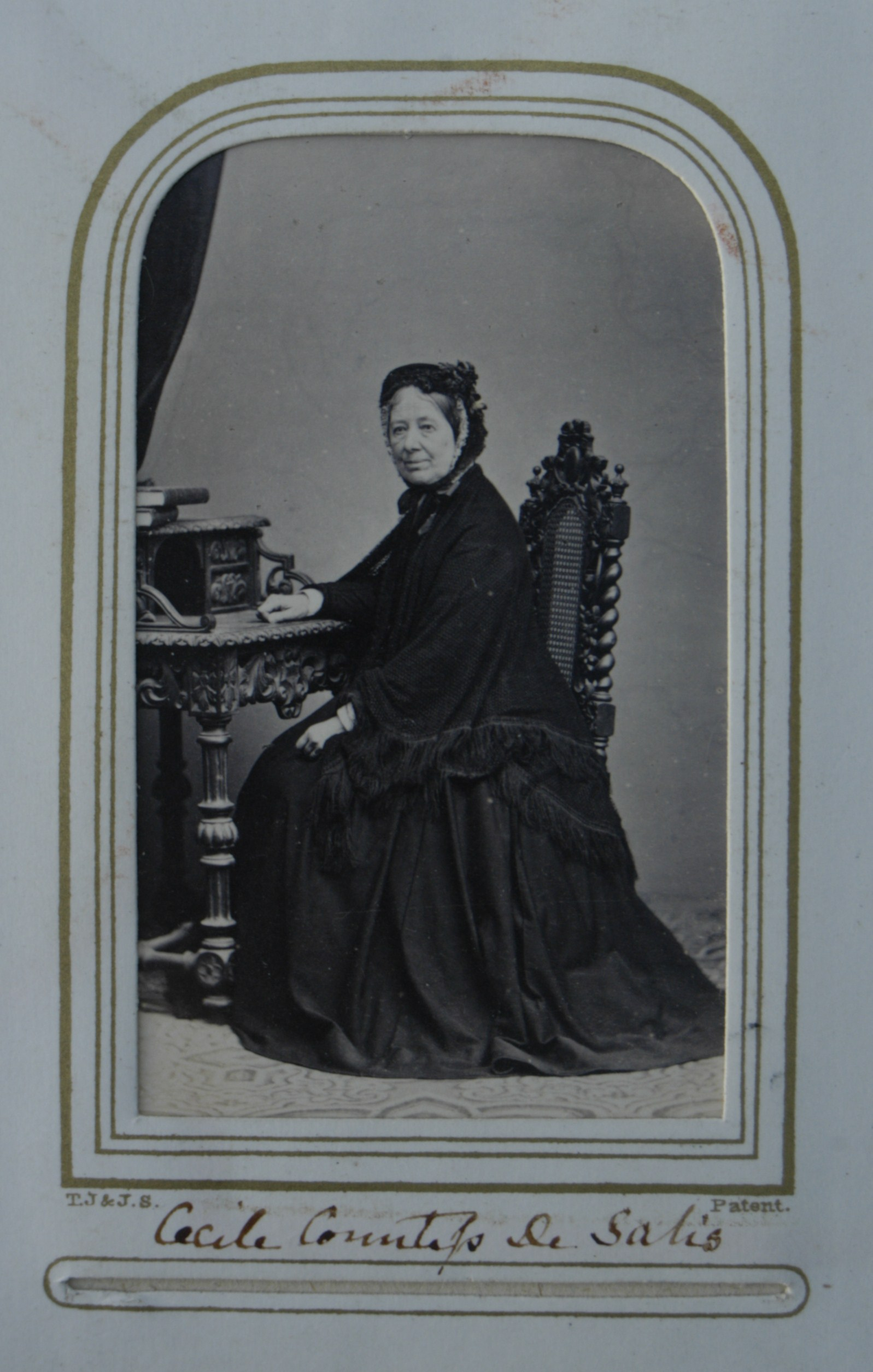
Carte de visite of second wife Cecile, Countess de Salis.

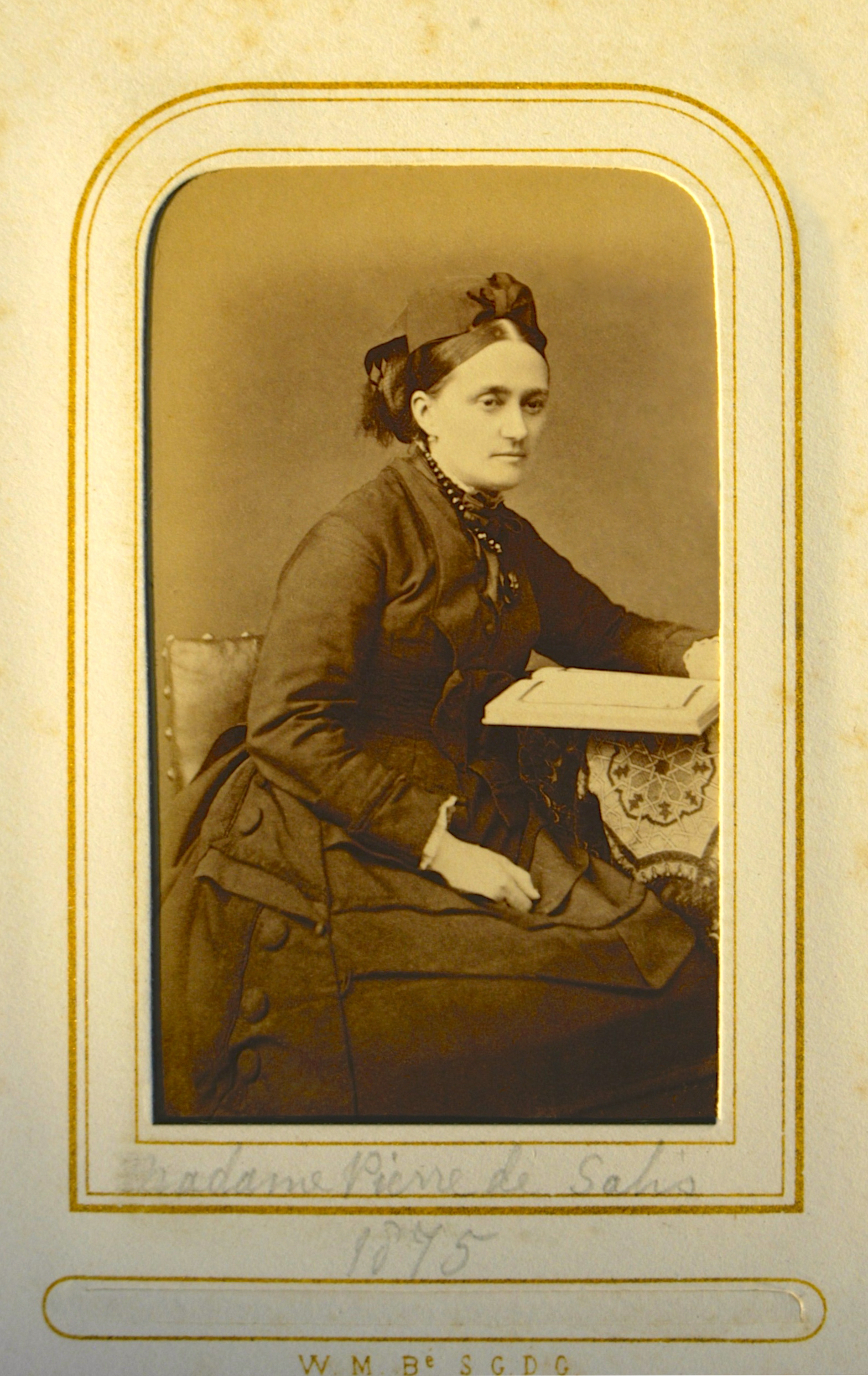
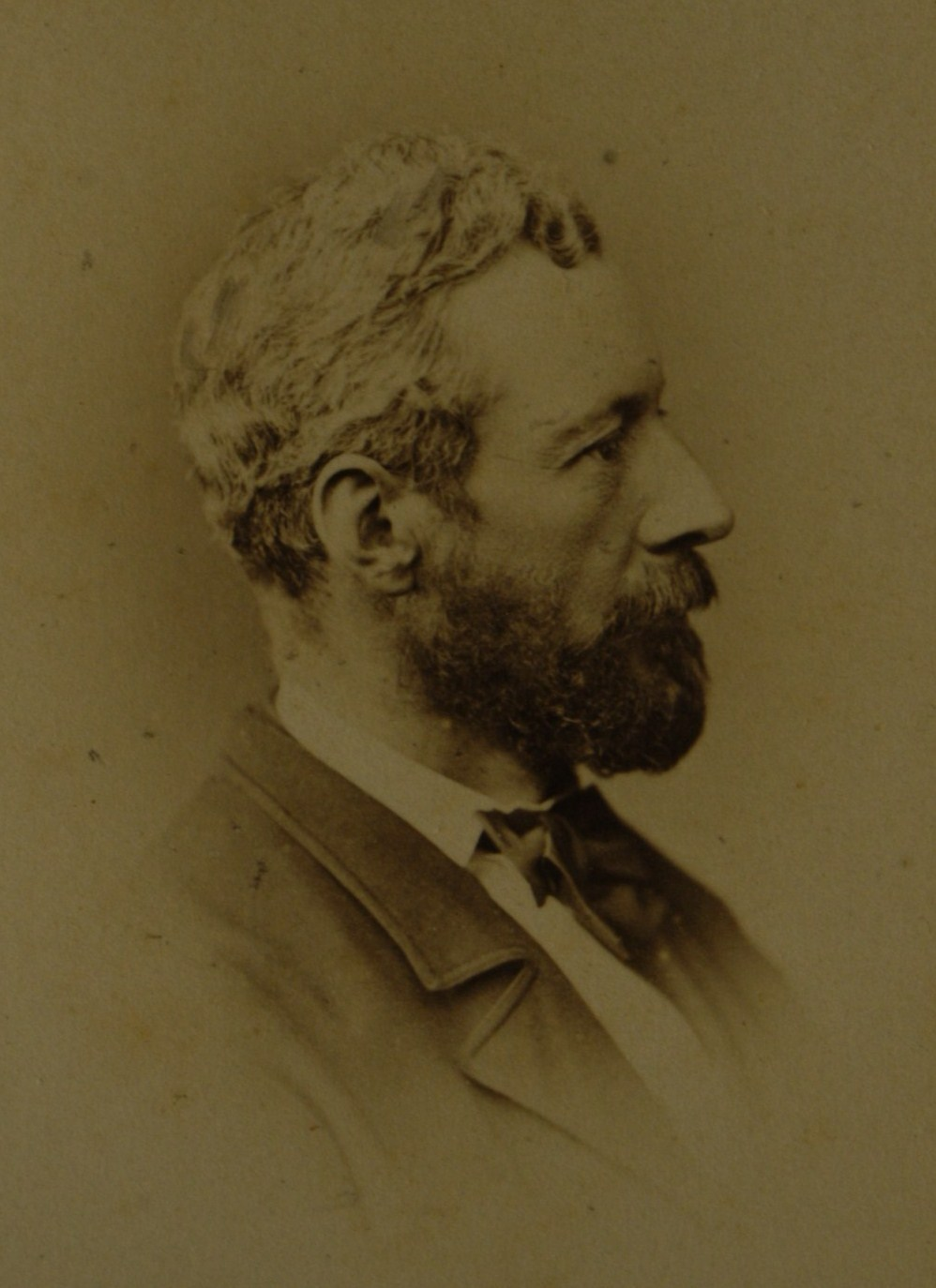
_{The Count's second wife Agnes Louisa (1837–1916), daughter of Charles La Trobe, first Lieutenant-Governor of Victoria, Australia, in 1875; and his younger son Pierre (1827–1919).}

_{His grandson, George Alois, who died of wounds suffered at Custoza in 1866.}

Peter, Count de Salis-Soglio, married twice:

- firstly: 9 February 1821, Henrietta Charlotte (d.10.1822), daughter of Colonel de Senarclens de St. Denys (Baron de Grancy);
- and secondly: 16 July 1824, Cecile Henrietta Marguerite (1802–1892) daughter of David Bourgeoise of Neuchâtel. She was niece of Henry, Comte de Meuron, Lt. Colonel and Chamberlain to the King of Prussia (as at 1824).

Children by his second wife:

- John Francis William de Salis, diplomat and numismatist.
- Peter (22 November 1827 – 27 March 1919), in the Austrian Service and then curator of Neuchâtel's art museum. Peter's only surviving child, Elisabeth Sophie (1880–1967), married Godefroy de Blonay, and became known as Baronne de Blonay.
- George Alois (1 December 1829 – 22 October 1866), was a captain in the 3rd (Archduke Charles) Lancer Regiment. Mortally wounded (one of 5,650 casualties) at the Battle of Custoza (1866) he was buried in Verona.
- Anna Sophia Elisabeth, Anna Grafin v. Salis-Soglio, (Neufchatel 28.7.1832–1916). She married (24.9.1858), a cousin, Johann Gaudenz Dietegan (Freiherr) v. Salis-Seewis (Chur 5.12.1825–27.3.1886) of Bothmar, Malans. Son of Johann-Jacob, Fhr. v. Salis-Seewis (Zurich 24.5.1800-Chur 17.7.1881) married (Malans, 6.1.1822) Anna Barbara v. Jenatsch (1800–1856).

== Life ==
After education in London, Edinburgh and Lausanne he was chef-de-Bataillon in the capitulated service of Switzerland (in the Swiss Guards of Louis XVIII and Charles X), in the service of the King of Naples (3eme Régiment Suisse under Francis I, King of the Two Sicilies), a Colonel in the Prussian Service, in the Uxbridge Volunteer Infantry, and a major in the Armagh Militia (1854).

- 1817 The Fleur de Lys, Paris.
- 1820 (Knight commander of the Princely) Chevalier de l'Ordre du Phoenix de Hohenlohe.
- 18xx Chevalier Grand Croix de l'Ordre Imperial Asiatique de Morale Universalle (it ran between 6 July 1835 – 1851, created by or for Mongol Sultan Alinea d'Eldir, possibly mythical).
- 18xx Knight of the Order of the Holy Sepulchre of Jerusalem.
- 18xx Commandeur Baron de l'Ordre Noble d'Epire.
- 1823, 1826, 1832, 1834, & 1835: Landammann of Stalla/Bivio.
- 18xx Knight of the Royal and Imperial Order of the Legion of Honour of France (Bourbon creation).
- 1831 Knight Royal Order of the Red Eagle (Prussian) (third class).
- 1832 Medal of the King of Prussia (for helping the suppression of the Insurrection of Neufchâtel).
- His father dies, Middlesex, October 1836.
- September 1837 'Count Peter De Salis, of Hillingdon' became Commandant of The Volunteer Infantry, of Uxbridge.
- 20 July 1844 (or 1843) admitted a Knight (Honour and Devotion/Croce d'Or Devozio) of St. John of Jerusalem, Roman branch.
- 1859, election into the English langue of the Sovereign Order of Malta. Capitular Bailiff of the English Langue and Grand Prior of Ireland of the Order by 1868. At that time the other two capitular bailiffs were his Tandragee neighbour Duke of Manchester, the Grand-Prior of England, and the 2nd Lord Leigh of Stoneleigh, who was the Bailiff of Aquila.

From 1832 he was deputy lieutenant of County Armagh. He was appointed a justice of the peace and high sheriff of Limerick in 1849. Four years later, 1853, he was nominated High Sheriff of Armagh.

- JP for Middlesex & Westminster.

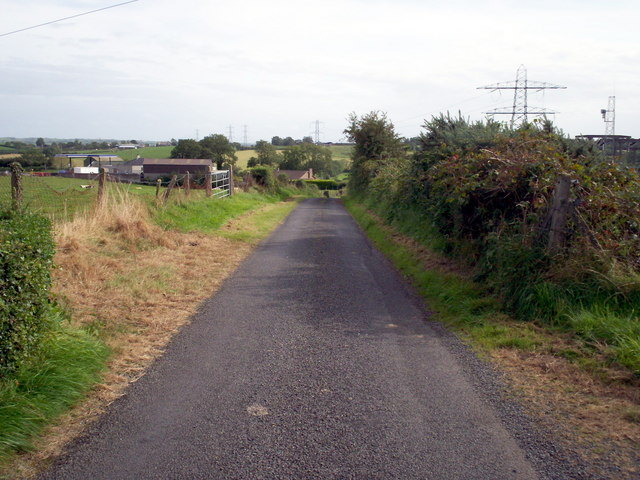
A view in Ballylisk. Ballylisk House is, in 2013, home to a cooking school.

- 1855 resident at Ballyknock Cottage, near Tandragee, Co. Armagh (Burke's Peerage, 1855).
- 1861 census the Count was boarding in Acton, west London, and was described as magistrate and landowner.
- 1865: Peter John Fane de Salis, of Tandaragee, Co. Armagh, was listed as living at Tandragee and at Turnham Green, Middlesex (Walford's County Families, 1865).
- 1868: Listed by Bigsby in 1868 as at Ballylisk House, near Tanderagee; St. John's Villa, Acton; and Hillingdon Place, Uxbridge.

He was buried in Kensal Green Cemetery.

== Ancestors ==
Some of De Salis's ancestors
Peter John de Salis	Jerome, Count De Salis	Peter, Count de Salis	Jerome, Count de Salis
Peter John de Salis	Jerome, Count De Salis	Peter, Count de Salis	Hon. Mary Fane, daughter of 1st Lord Fane.
Peter John de Salis	Jerome, Count De Salis	Anna v. Salis-Soglio	Giovanni v. Salis-Soglio (1707–1790).
Peter John de Salis	Jerome, Count De Salis	Anna v. Salis-Soglio	Katherina Barbara (1711–1788), daughter of Rudolfo v. Salis-Soglio (1652–1735).
Peter John de Salis	Sohia Drake. They married in 1797.	Vice Admiral Francis William Drake (d.1787). Admiral of the Blue, then Red, then White. Brother of Sir Francis Henry Drake, 5th Bt. (d.1792). Brothers-in-law of Lord Heathfield.	Sir Francis Henry Drake, 4th Bt., MP (d.1739/40). Descendant of Francis Drake.
Peter John de Salis	Sohia Drake. They married in 1797.	Vice Admiral Francis William Drake (d.1787). Admiral of the Blue, then Red, then White. Brother of Sir Francis Henry Drake, 5th Bt. (d.1792). Brothers-in-law of Lord Heathfield.	Anne Heathcote (buried Hackney 5 Nov 1768), daughter of Samuel Heathcote. Sister of Sir William Heathcote, 1st Bt.
Peter John de Salis	Sohia Drake. They married in 1797.	Elizabeth Heathcote (d.1797). A first cousin of her husband.	Sir William Heathcote, 1st Bt., of Hursley, Hampshire (1693–1751).
Peter John de Salis	Sohia Drake. They married in 1797.	Elizabeth Heathcote (d.1797). A first cousin of her husband.	Elizabeth Parker, (d.1746/7), dau of Thomas Parker, Earl of Macclesfield.

== Notes ==
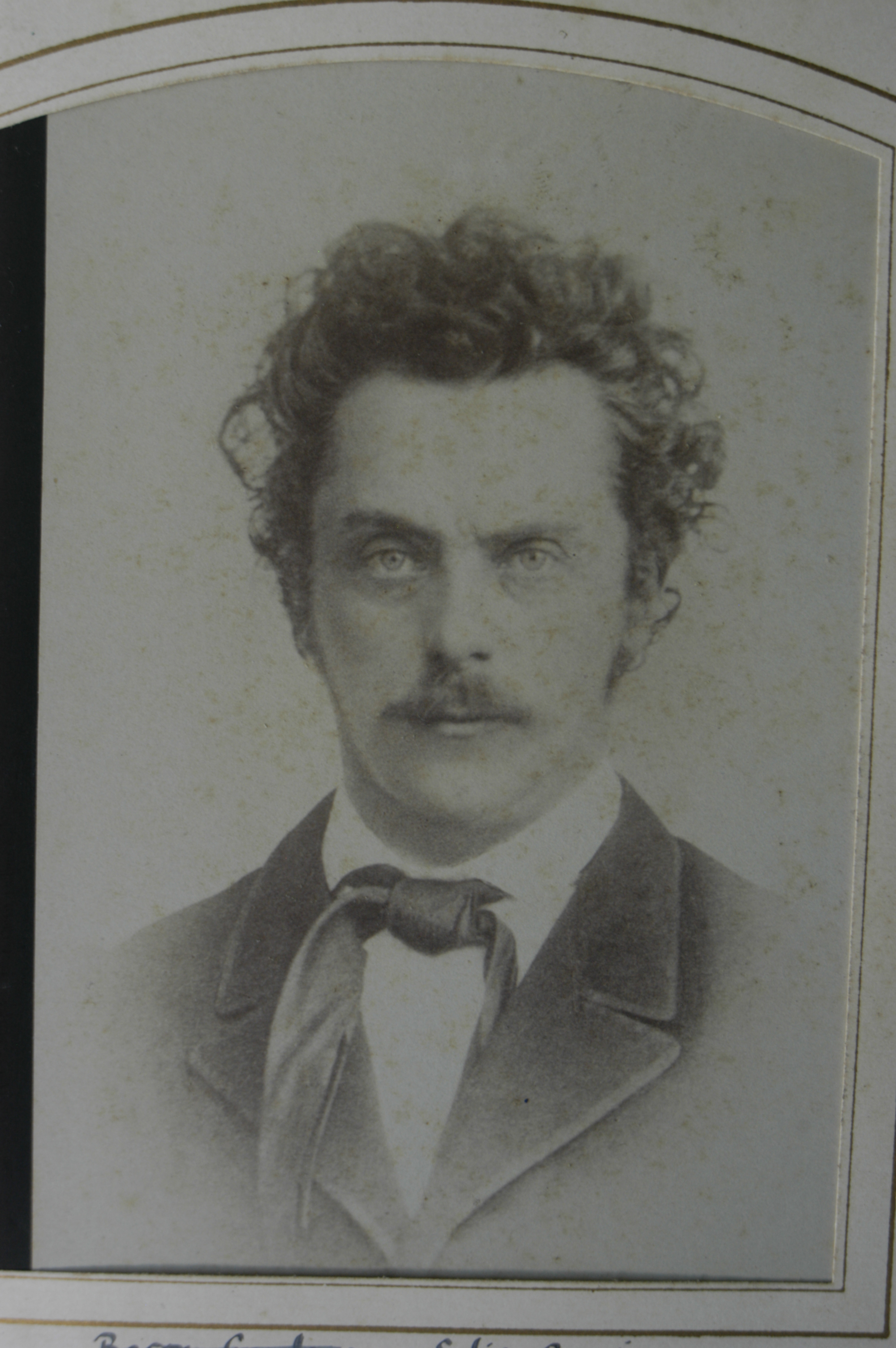
Son-in-law: J. G. D. v. Salis, Freiherr v. Salis-Seewis, of Malans.

Regnal titles
Preceded by Jerome, 4th Count de Salis	Count de Salis-Soglio; 1836–1870	Succeeded by John Francis William, 6th Count de Salis
