= Peter W. S. Y. Scarlett =

British diplomat (1905–1987)

Sir Peter William Shelley Yorke Scarlett KCMG KCVO (30 March 1905 – 28 December 1987) was a British diplomat who was ambassador to Norway and to the Holy See.

== Career ==
Peter Scarlett was educated at Eton and Christ Church, Oxford. He entered the Foreign Office in 1929 and served in Cairo, Baghdad and Lisbon. He acted as Chargé d’Affaires in Riga 1937–38 and was attached to the representative of Latvia at the coronation of King George VI and Queen Elizabeth in 1937. He served in Brussels from 1938 to 1940 when he was captured by enemy forces but, as a diplomat, was returned to the UK where he resumed duties at the Foreign Office until 1944 when he was appointed to the embassy in Paris under Sir Alfred Duff Cooper. In 1946 he moved to Allied Forces Headquarters at Caserta, southern Italy, then was Counsellor at the Foreign Office 1947–50 and Inspector of HM Diplomatic Service Establishments 1950–52.

Scarlett was British Permanent Representative on the Council of Europe, Strasbourg, 1952–55; HM Ambassador to Norway 1955–60; and finally Minister to the Holy See 1960–65. He retired from the Diplomatic Service in 1965 and was Chairman of the Church of England's Cathedrals Advisory Committee 1967–81.

Scarlett was appointed CMG in the New Year Honours of 1949, knighted KCVO in 1955 and KCMG in the Queen's Birthday Honours of 1958.

== Personal ==
Scarlett's wife Elisabeth was daughter of Major Sir John Birchall, MP.

== See also ==
- British Ambassadors to the Holy See

Diplomatic posts
| Preceded by Sir Michael Wright | Ambassador Extraordinary and Plenipotentiary in Oslo; 1955 – 1960 | Succeeded by Sir John Walker |
| Preceded by Sir Marcus Cheke | Envoy Extraordinary and Minister Plenipotentiary at the Holy See; 1960 – 1965 | Succeeded by Sir Michael Williams |
