= John Francis Charles, 7th Count de Salis-Soglio =

Anglo-Irish British diplomat and landowner

Sir John Francis Charles de Salis KCMG CVO
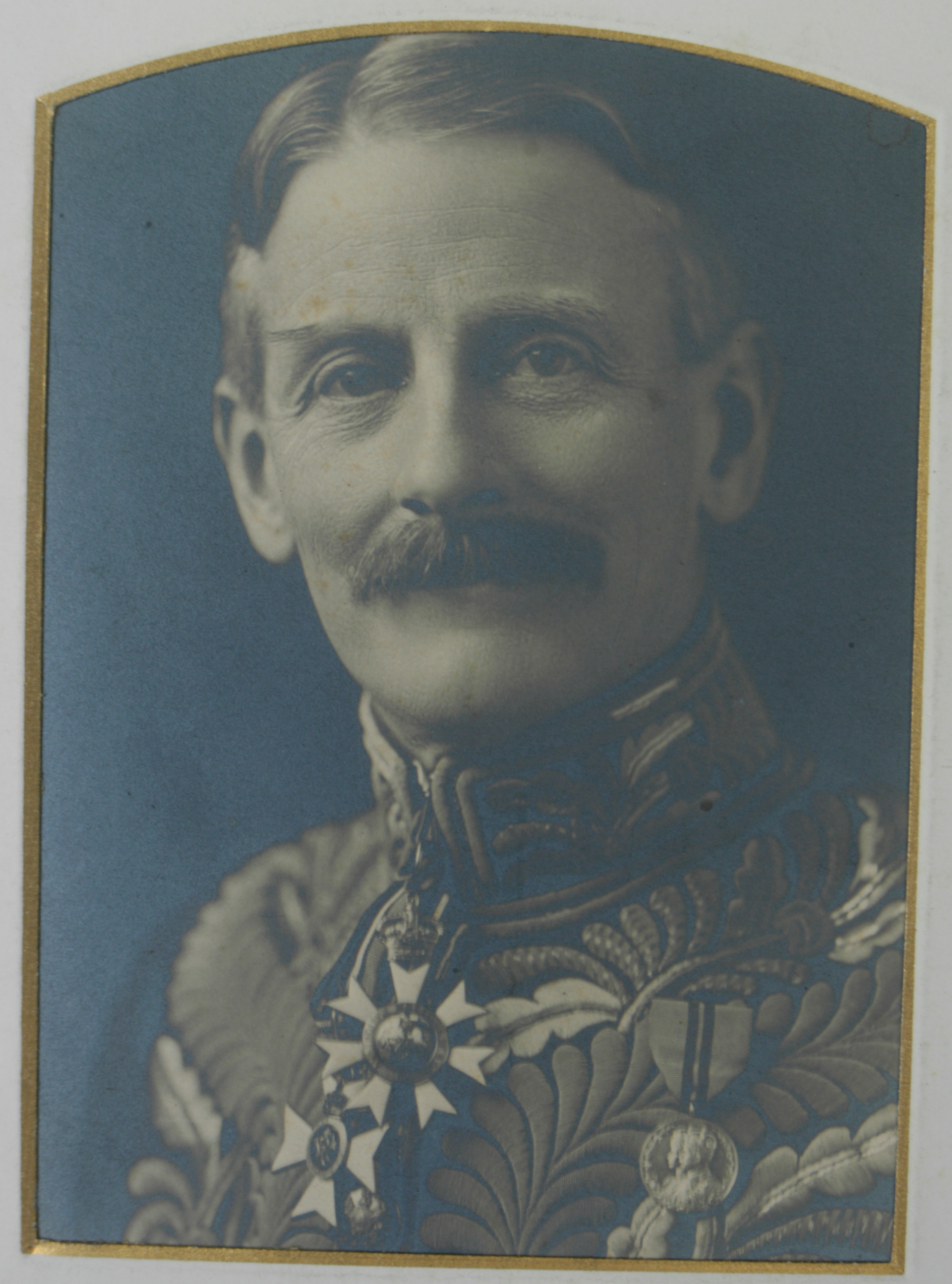
- Count de Salis in Court Uniform, circa 1911-1923
- Born: 19 July 1864
- Died: 14 January 1939 (aged 74)
- Education: Eton College
- Occupations: British diplomat and landowner
- Spouse: Hélène Marie de Riquet
- Parent(s): Count John Francis William de Salis, Amelia Frances Harriet
- Awards: Knight Commander of the Order of St Michael and St George (KCMG), Commander of the Royal Victorian Order (CVO)

The Count in 1869

Sir John Francis Charles de Salis, 7th Count de Salis KCMG CVO (19 July 1864 – 14 January 1939) was an Anglo-Irish British diplomat and landowner.

== Family background ==
He was the elder son of Count John Francis William de Salis (1825–1871), a diplomat and numismatist of Hillingdon, and Amelia Frances Harriet (1837 – 8 January 1885), eldest daughter of Christopher Tower, JP DL MP, (1800–84), of Huntsmoor Park, Iver, Buckinghamshire, and of Weald Hall, Essex.

== Diplomatic career ==
After being educated at Eton College (1877–1882, Edward Compton Austen Leigh's house) he was nominated an attaché in the diplomatic service on 20 November 1886. He passed a competitive examination on 14 January 1887. On 12 June 1888 he was appointed to Brussels as an attaché and promoted to Third Secretary on 14 January 1889. From 24 April 1892 he served in Madrid, and was promoted to Second Secretary on 22 August 1893. From August 1894 he served in Cairo under Lord Cromer in charge of the agency there when the Dervishes were active (he was granted an allowance for knowledge of Arabic on 2 April 1895). In autumn 1897 he was in Berlin, in 1899 in Brussels and from 1901 in Athens, as head of chancery (dealing with the Macedonian problem). He was promoted to First Secretary on 1 April 1904. He was employed between 1901 and 1906 at the Foreign Office in London, and appointed a British Delegate for negotiation of a new Commercial Convention with Romania on 7 September 1905. He served as Berlin chargé d'affaires and counsellor of embassy from 1 July 1906 to 1911, and was a British delegate at the International Copyright Conference at Berlin, October–November 1908. From November 1911 to 1916 he served as Envoy Extraordinary and Minister Plenipotentiary to the King of Montenegro at Cettinjé, and was Envoy Extraordinary and Minister Plenipotentiary on a special mission to the Holy See in 1916–1923, (Pope Benedict XV 1916–1922, and same to Pope Pius XI 1922–1923). He was a member of the 1931 Malta Royal Commission (report issued in a blue book, 11 February 1932).

== De Salis Report ==
In 1919 the British Government sent de Salis to investigate the Serbian occupation of Montenegro, but his resulting report was suppressed. Alexander Devine in The Martyred Nation, 1924 wrote: The fact is the Report contains such a damning indictment of Serbian rule that its publication would immediately provoke interference; and that interference did not suit our policy towards the French Government.

In the House of Commons, Ronald McNeill repeatedly asked about production of the Report and De Salis's possible arrest. But as Devine put it: When the day came that Mr. McNeill found himself Under-Secretary for Foreign Affairs in the late Conservative Ministry, the Report was on his desk in the Foreign Office and Mr. McNeill could no more disclose its contents than his predecessors could. Meanwhile, Lord Sydenham in the House of Lords, Hansard, 29 November 1920 said:

The Papers for which I ask are two. The first is the Report of Count de Salis, which the noble Earl (Curzon) the Leader of the House said he had no objection to giving, but he added— If the report is made public, the names of witnesses would be contained in it who gave their evidence to Count de Salis only on the pledge of strictest secrecy, and who might, I think, suffer seriously from divulgation. Could there be a clearer admission of what is going on in Montenegro?

In a letter, dated New York, 1 May 1922, published in The New York Times, 7 May 1922, Ronald Tree described the Count as: '..perhaps the greatest English authority on the Balkans'.

In April 1920, months after the possible event, an alleged arrest and imprisonment by the Serbians, the New York Times reported:

Serbs arrest de Salis, Montenegro minister accuses Britain and Wilson to Nicholas.
Paris, 2 April.
"Count de Salis, formerly British Minister to Montenegro and later a special envoy to the Vatican for the British Government, has been arrested and imprisoned by the Serbians while executing a mission of investigation for his Government. This information is contained in a declaration made to King Nicholas of Montenegro, who is now in Paris, by the Montenegrin Foreign Minister. Count de Salis's life has been in danger for a long time, according to this declaration, which prefaces the details of the incident by recalling Earl Curzon's declaration in the British House of Lords that the Montenegrins were anxious for a union with Serbia. Instead of demanding reparations, the declaration adds, the British Foreign Office suppressed the report of Count de Salis and continued to support Serbian claims. The declaration alleges the report was to the effect that the Serbian army 'which overran Montenegro after the armistice terrorized the population'. The reign of terror still continues, says the declaration, which, after asserting that whatever Serbian troops appear the occupation is followed by pillage, incendiarism and massacres, gives details. In conclusion the complaint is made in the declaration that 'Europe knows what is happening to Montenegro but remains indifferent,' and that President Wilson, 'the great champion of small nations, persistently turns a deaf ear.'"

The sensitivity of the issue is shown by the fact that only one of his four obituaries in The Times (1939) (19 January 1939, page 17, column D) mentions his Montenegrin Report, although not the arrest.

== Marriage ==
He married in 1890 Hélène Marie de Riquet, Comtesse de Caraman-Chimay (18 August 1864 – 31 May 1902), daughter of Marie Eugène Auguste de Riquet, Prince de Caraman-Chimay, son of Joseph de Riquet de Caraman (1808-1886), 17th Prince de Chimay and 1st Prince de Caraman.

Regnal titles
Preceded by John Francis William, 6th Count de Salis	Count de Salis-Soglio; 1871–1939	Succeeded by John Eugen, 8th Count de Salis
