= John Constable (Jesuit) =

Jesuit

John Constable (alias Lacey; pen-name Clerophilus Alethes) (10 November 1676 or 1678, in Lincolnshire – 28 March 1743) was an English Jesuit controversial writer.

== Life ==
In 1695 he entered the Society of Jesus. For many years he served the Fitzherbert family at Swinnerton, where he is buried.

== Works ==
Constable's chief controversial opponents were:

- Pierre François le Courayer (1681–1776) who championed Anglican orders, came over to England in 1728, was lionized, and eventually buried in the cloisters of Westminster; and
- Charles Dodd, a pseudonym of Hugh Tootell, who wrote, Constable maintained, with a prejudice against Jesuits.

The chief writings of Constable are:

- "Remarks on Courayer's Book in Defense of English Ordinations, wherein their invalidity is fully proved", an answer to Courayer's "Dissertations" of 1723;
- "The Stratagem Discovered to show that Courayer writes 'Booty', and is only a sham defender of these ordinations", by "Clerophilus Alethes" (8vo, 1729), against Joseph Trapp, The Church of England Defended Against the Calumnies and False Reasoning of the Church of Rome (1727):
- "Doctrine of Antiquity concerning the Eucharist" by "Clerophilus Alethes" (8vo, 1736);
- "Specimen of Amendments proposed to the Compiler of 'The Church History of England'", by "Clerophilus Alethes" (12mo, 1741);
- "Advice to the Author of 'The Church History of England'", manuscript at Stonyhurst.

Joseph Gillow enumerates a few other writings by Constable.
