= Mosborough Hall =

House in Sheffield, South Yorkshire, England

Coordinates: 53°19′18″N 1°21′27″W

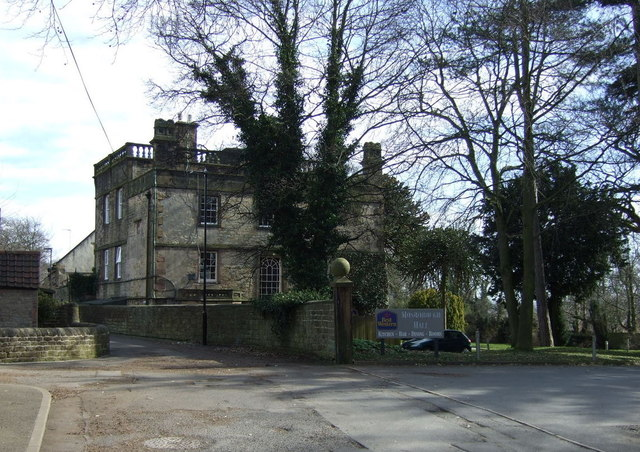
Mosborough Hall Hotel (2015)

Mosborough Hall is a 17th-century Grade II-listed building in Mosborough, Sheffield, England. The building was originally a manor house in what was then a small village in Derbyshire, however due to population growth over the years the village was incorporated into the city of Sheffield and the hall today is used as a hotel.

== Notable occupants ==
The original Mosborough Hall was once owned by William Carey and his son Henry Carey, 1st Baron Hunsdon is also said to have been born in the hall.

Other former owners of the hall include Samuel Staniforth, a local mine owner from the village as well as members of the local Molyneux, Rotherham and Stones families.

The noted Catholic historian, writer and priest Hugh Tootell (better known under the nom de plume of Charles Dodd) lived at the hall while serving as chaplain to the Molyneux family between 1689-1711 and again from 1716 to 1718.

Besides the building, the house's service buildings, gate and walls are also listed.
