= Harlington School =

Location
- Pinkwell Lane; Harlington, London; UB3 1PB; England; 51.4972°N 0.4364°W

Information
- Type: Foundation school
- Motto: Aspiration, Community and Diversity- by PW
- Religious affiliation: none
- Local authority: Hillingdon
- Department for Education URN: 102451 Tables
- Ofsted: Reports
- Head teacher: Antonio D’Onofrio
- Gender: Mixed
- Age: 11 to 18
- Enrolment: 1,046 as of April 2016
- Houses: Da Vinci, Mandela, Brunel, Seacole
- Colours: Blue, red and yellow
- Website: www.harlingtonschool.co.uk

Harlington School is a mixed secondary school and sixth form located in the Harlington area of the London Borough of Hillingdon, England.

== Ofsted ==
On its most recent full school inspection in 2015, Ofsted rated the school as "Good": this was an improvement on the previous 2013 rating of "Requires Improvement".

== New Building ==
Harlington School in Hayes, Middlesex, opened a new campus in November 2023, It was delayed and was a half term into the 23/24 academic year. replacing life-expired, split-level buildings.
