= Joseph Trapp =

English clergyman, academic, poet and pamphleteer

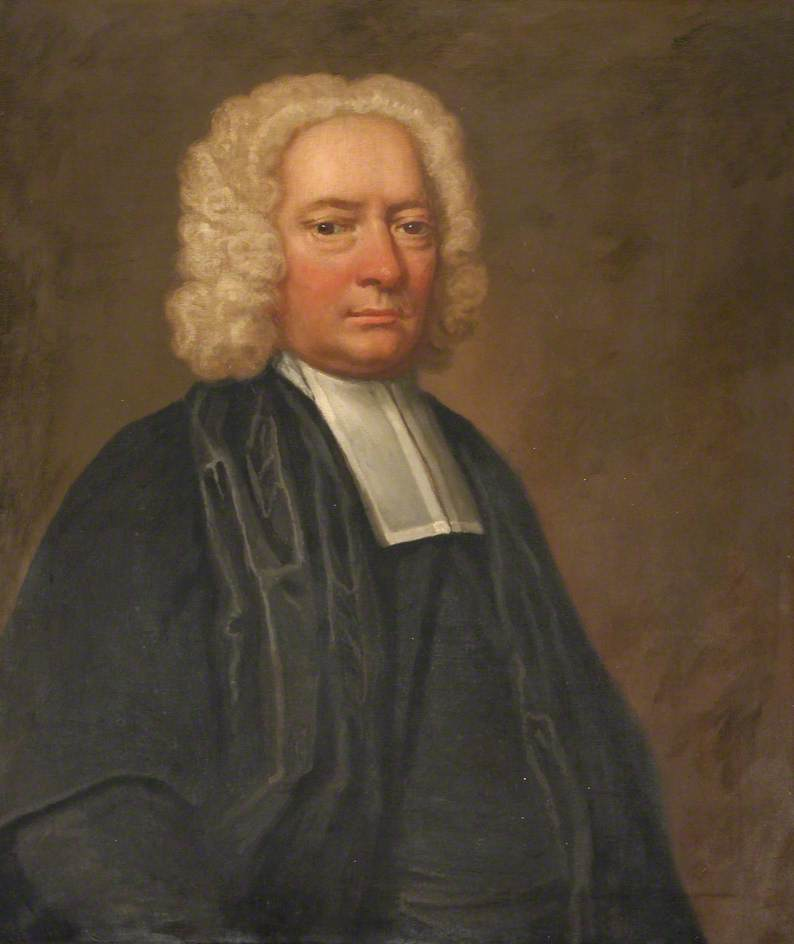
Portrait of Joseph Trapp by unknown artist (early 18th century)

Joseph Trapp (1679–1747) was an English clergyman, academic, poet and pamphleteer. His production as a younger man of occasional verse (some anonymous, or in Latin) and dramas led to his appointment as the first Oxford Professor of Poetry in 1708. Later his High Church opinions established him in preferment and position. As a poet, he was not well thought of by contemporaries, with Jonathan Swift refusing a dinner in an unavailing attempt to avoid revising one of Trapp’s poems, and Abel Evans making an epigram on his blank verse translation of the Aeneid with a reminder of the commandment against murder.

== Early life ==
He was born at Cherrington, Gloucestershire, in November 1679, and baptised there on 18 December 1679, was the second son of Joseph Trapp (1638–1698), rector of Cherrington from 1662, and grandson of John Trapp. After a training at home by his father and some time at New College School, he matriculated at Wadham College, Oxford, on 11 July 1695. He was elected Goodridge exhibitioner in 1695 and in subsequent years to 1700, and scholar in 1696. He graduated B. A. 22 April 1699, and M.A. 19 May 1702, and either in 1703 or 1704 he became a fellow of his college.

Early in his academic career Trapp began to versify for Oxford collections; and he wrote poetical paraphrases and translations which are included in the Miscellanies of John Dryden and Elijah Fenton. His play of Abramule brought him some reputation. He became the first professor of poetry at Oxford, a position which he held from 14 July 1708 to 1718. His lectures were delivered in Latin and showed originality, for example on ut pictura poesis; but he was thought to have fawned too much on William Lancaster the vice-chancellor.

== High Church man ==
Trapp at the same period plunged into politics as a Tory and a high churchman. He assisted Henry Sacheverell at his trial in 1709 and 1710, and on Sacheverell's recommendation became in April 1710 his successor in the lectureship at Newington, Surrey. The preface to a tract on the trial was written by him, and in September 1710 he vindicated Sacheverell's noisy progress into exile in an anonymous pamphlet. Another anonymous pamphlet by Trapp was called The true genuine Tory Address and the true genuine Whig Address set one against another, 1710.

In January 1711 Sir Constantine Phipps, the Lord Chancellor of Ireland, took on Trapp as his chaplain, and Trapp wrote partisan political pieces, incurring scorn from Swift. He married in 1712 a daughter of Alderman White of St. Mary's, Oxford, and resigned as a Fellow of Wadham. That year he was chaplain to Henry St John, 1st Viscount Bolingbroke, a place Swift claimed he had arranged. On 1 April 1713 Swift would not dine with Bolingbroke because he was expected to 'look over a dull poem' of Trapp's; afterwards he did correct the poem, printed anonymously at Dublin, as Peace, a Poem. It was set to music by William Croft.

From 1714 to 1722 he held by the gift of the Earl of Peterborough the rectory of Dauntsey in Wiltshire, and through the interest of William Lancaster he obtained in 1715 the lectureship at the church of St. Martin-in-the-Fields, Westminster. The governors of St. Bartholomew's Hospital elected Trapp on 20 April 1722 as vicar of the united parishes of Christ Church, Newgate Street, and St. Leonard, Foster Lane, and in 1733 he was presented by Lord Bolingbroke to the rectory of Harlington in Middlesex. He also held lectureships in several London churches, and became president of Sion College. He died of pleurisy at Harlington on 22 November 1747. and was buried on the north side of the entrance into the chancel, upon the north wall of which is a monument; another, the cost of which was borne by the parishioners, is on the east wall of the chancel of Newgate church. The books in Trapp's library at Warwick Lane, London, to which Sacheverell's library had been added, and those at Harlington, with his son's collections, passed to Robert Palk.

== Controversy ==
Real Nature of Church and Kingdom of Christ, 1717, was a reply to Benjamin Hoadly in the Bangorian Controversy. It was answered by Gilbert Burnet, second son of Bishop Burnet, and by several other writers.

In the space of a few weeks in 1726 several Londoners became Catholic converts, and Trapp published a treatise of Popery truly stated and briefly confuted, in three parts, which reached a third edition in 1745. In 1727 he renewed the attack in The Church of England defended against the Church of Rome, in Answer to a late Sophistical and Insolent Popish Book. As a compliment for these labours he was created by the university of Oxford Doctor of Divinity by diploma on 1 February 1728.

George Whitefield went to Christ Church, Newgate Street, on 29 April 1739, and heard Trapp preach against him one of four discourses on the nature, folly, sin, and danger of being righteous overmuch; they were printed in 1739. Answers to them were published by Whitefield, William Law, Robert Seagrave, and others, and an anonymous reply bore the sarcastic title of Dr. Trapp vindicated from the Imputation of being a Christian. He retorted with The True Spirit of the Methodists and their Allies: in Answer to six out of the seven Pamphlets against Dr Trapp's Sermons (anon.), 1740.

== Works ==
Of his translation into blank verse of Virgil, the first volume of the Aeneis came out in 1718, the second in 1720, and the translation of the complete works with notes, was published in three volumes in 1731 and 1735. His Johannis Miltoni Paradisus Amissus Latine redditus (vol. i. 1741, vol. ii. 1744) was a Latin translation of John Milton's Paradise Lost, printed at his own cost, and he lost heavily on it. A modern critical view sees a definite intention in the translation of Virgil into Miltonic blank verse, followed by the translation of Milton into Virgilian hexameters, namely to place Milton as the English Virgil.

== See also ==
- John Constable (Jesuit)
