= Harlington, London =

District of Hayes, London, England

Coordinates: 51.4859°N 0.4364°W

Harlington
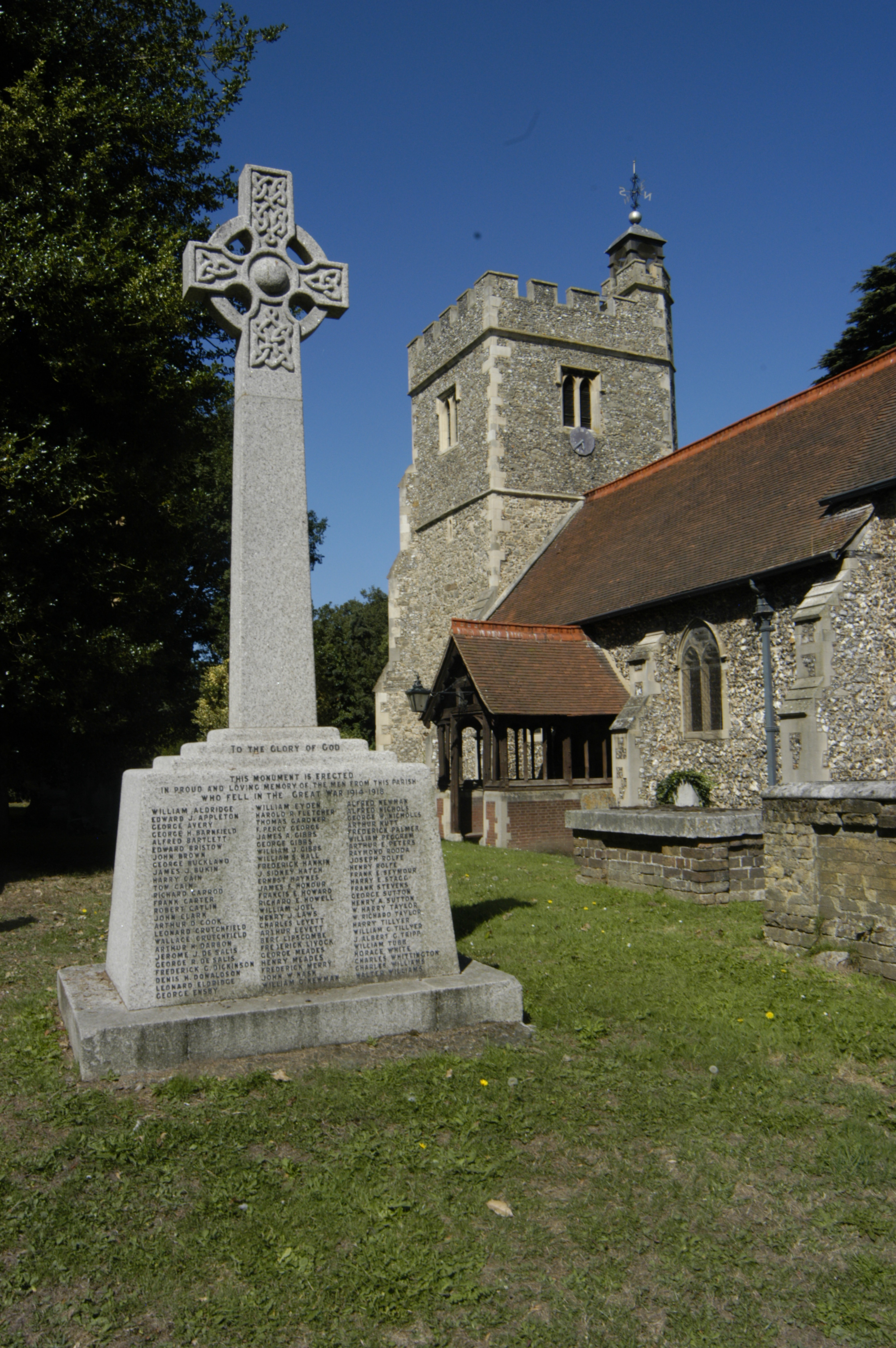
- The Grade I Listed parish church is the oldest of the listed buildings in Harlington. The War Memorial was designed by C. O. Scott.

- Location within Greater London
- OS grid reference: TQ085775
  - Charing Cross: 13.5 mi (21.7 km) E
- London borough: Hillingdon
- Ceremonial county: Greater London
- Region: London
- Country: England
- Sovereign state: United Kingdom
- Post town: HAYES
- Postcode district: UB3
- Dialling code: 020
- Police: Metropolitan
- Fire: London
- Ambulance: London
- UK Parliament: Hayes and Harlington
- London Assembly: Ealing and Hillingdon

Harlington is a district of Hayes in the London Borough of Hillingdon and one of five historic parishes partly developed into London Heathrow Airport and associated businesses, the one most heavily developed being Harmondsworth. It is centred 13.6 miles (21.9 km) west of Charing Cross. The district adjoins Hayes to the north and shares a railway station with the larger district, which is its post town, on the Great Western Main Line. It is in the west of the county of Greater London and until 1965 it was in the south-west corner of the historic county of Middlesex.

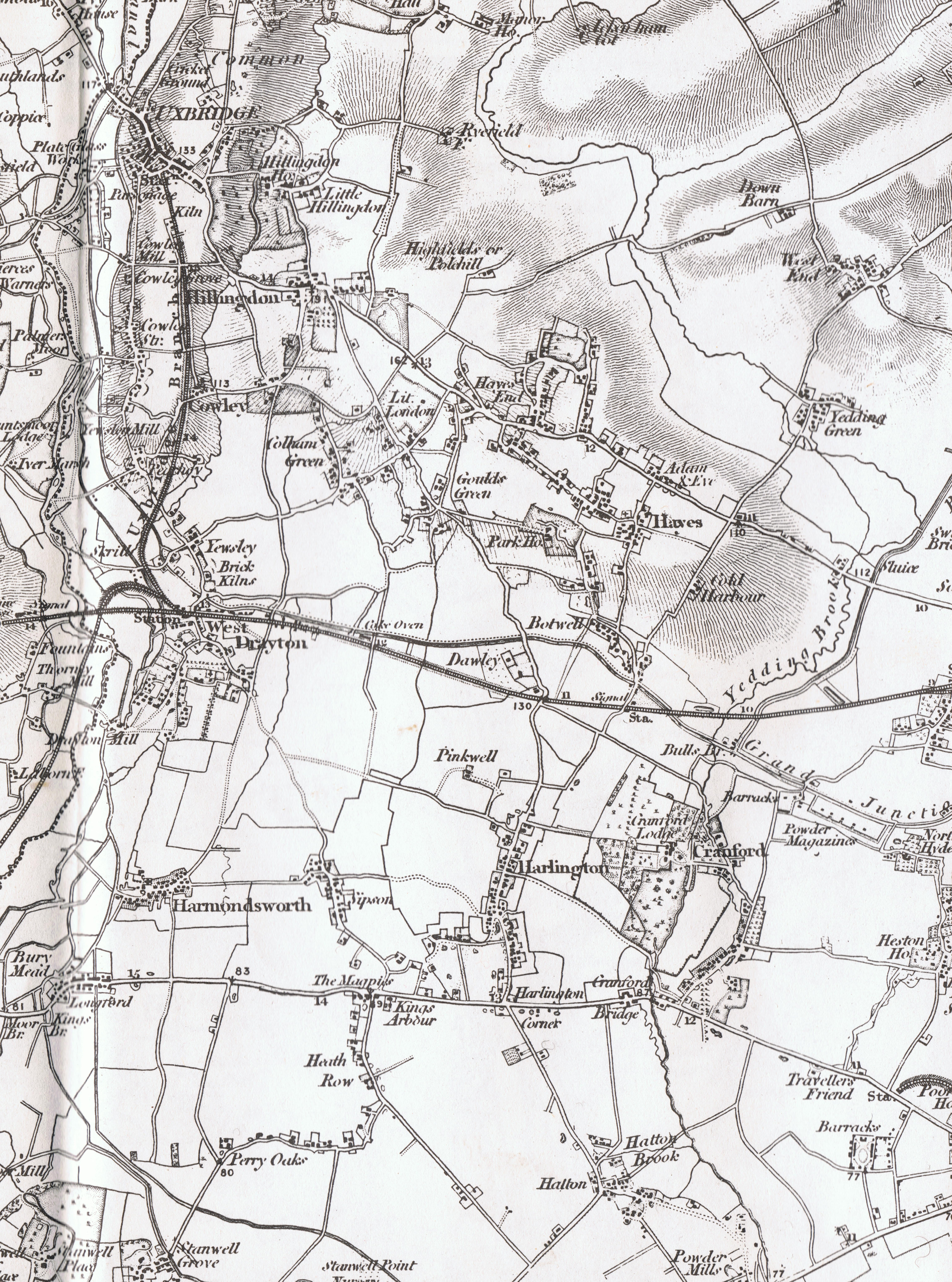
Harlington as seen on Ordnance Survey map sheet 71, 1822–1890, with railway added 1891.

== Etymology ==
The place-name Harlington is recorded in Anglo-Saxon as Hygereding tun: "Hygered's people's farmstead".

== History ==
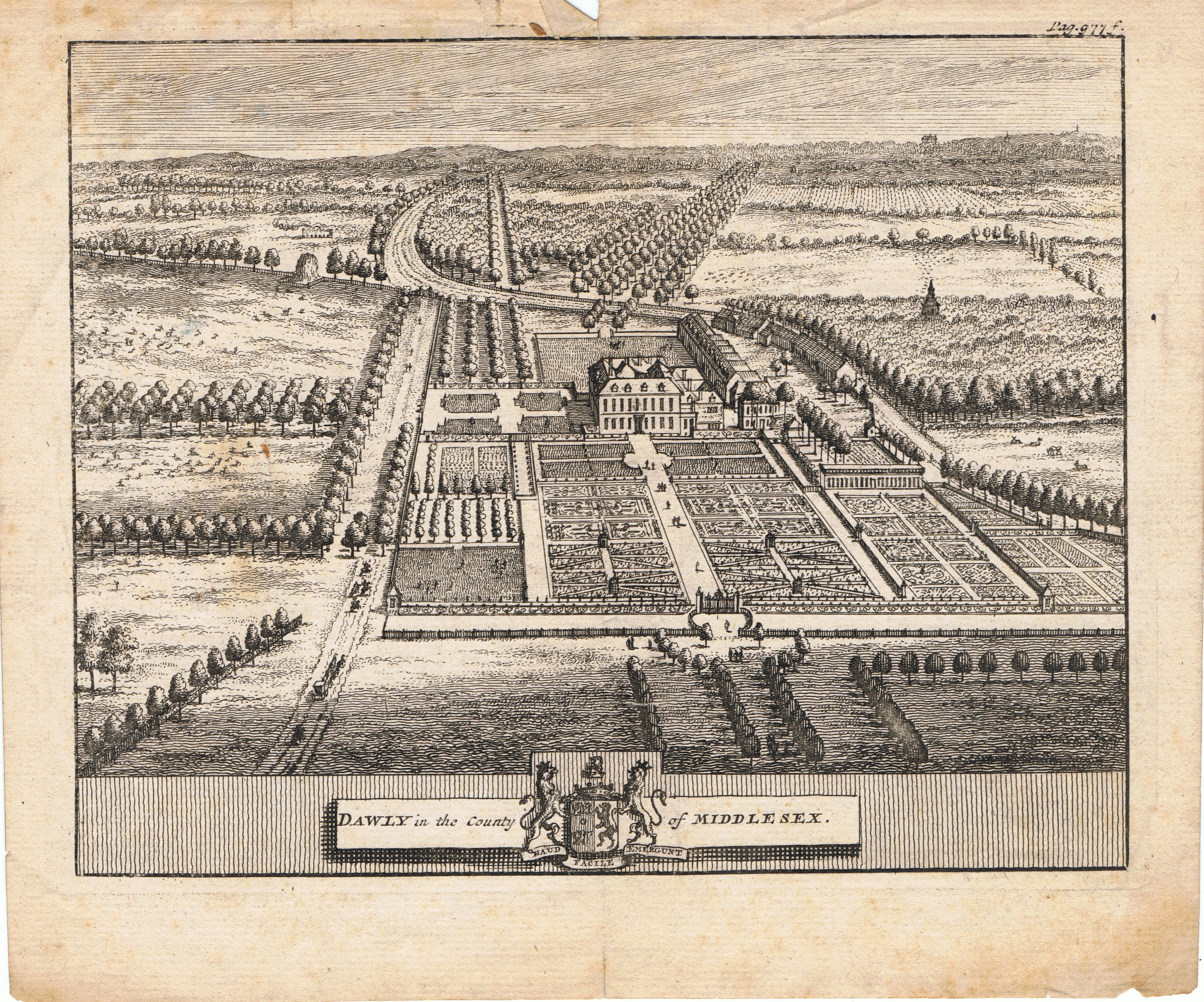
Bolingbroke and Ossulston's Dawley House (demolished), north-west of the station

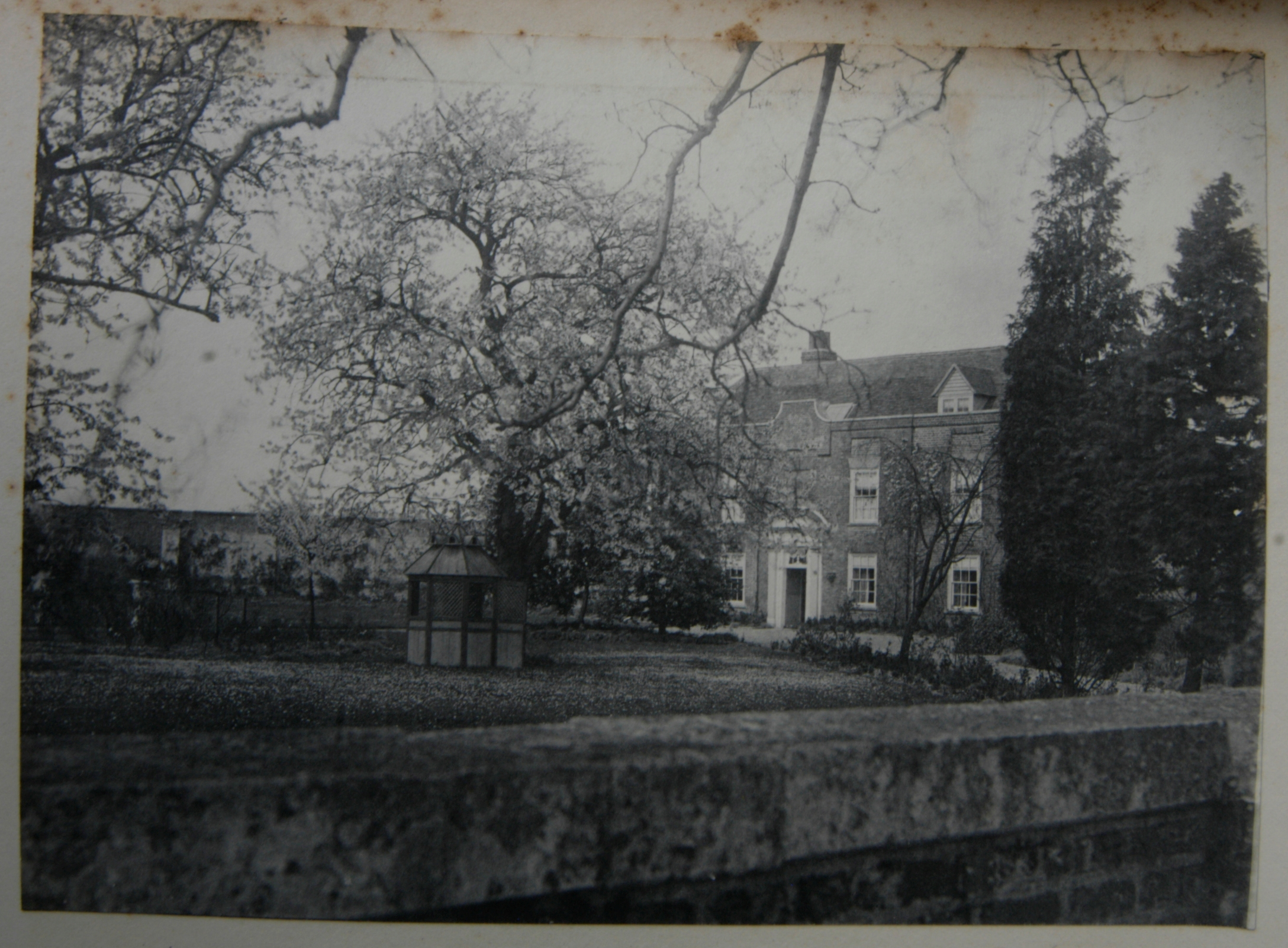
Photograph of Dawley House, in the spring of 1902. This was the remains of the house of Bolingbroke and Ossulston.

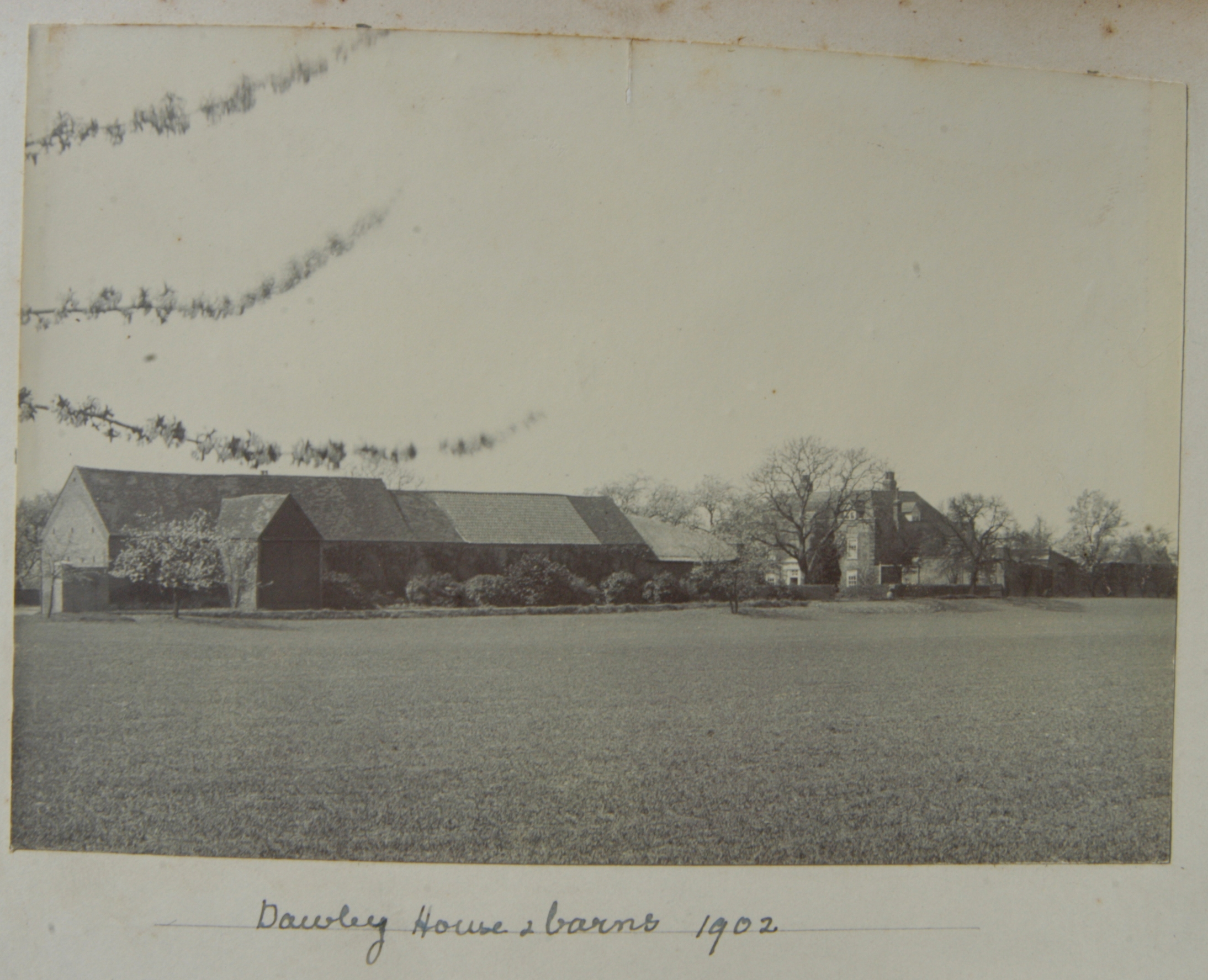
Photograph of dilapidated Dawley House and barns, Harlington, 1902. (Between the Great Western Railway and the canal). Home of Bolingbroke and Ossulston.

The earliest surviving mention of Harlington appears to be in a 9th-century charter in which land at Botwell in Hayes was said to be bounded on the west by "Hygeredington" and "Lullinges" tree. The first of these must be Harlington; the second has not been identified. The boundary between Hayes and Harlington, which may thus have been defined by the date of this charter, was later marked by North Hyde Road and Dawley Road, but Dawley Road may not have followed the boundary before the 18th century.

=== Administrative history ===
By 1834 the select vestry (informally known simply as the vestry) employed a paid assistant overseer. In 1824 a surgeon for the poor of Cranford and Harlington was appointed by the vestries of both. Their later co-operation saw the establishment of Harlington's National School jointly with in 1848, and its cottage hospital jointly with Cranford and Harmondsworth in 1884.

Dates	Entities
c. 1840	Harlington Parish then Civil Parish
1872	Harlington Parish then Civil Parish	Staines Rural Sanitary District
1889	Harlington Parish then Civil Parish	Staines Rural Sanitary District	Middlesex County Council
1894	Harlington Parish then Civil Parish	Staines Rural District	Middlesex County Council
1930	Harlington Parish then Civil Parish	Hayes and Harlington Urban District	Middlesex County Council
1965		London Borough of Hillingdon	Hillingdon L.B. with Mayor of London, London Assembly and predecessor

In 1924 the civil parish council (CPC) asked Staines Rural District Council (RDC) to light the village street and this was done a year later. The cemetery in Cherry Lane was opened in 1936 by the UDC and the CPC started its first allotments in 1895, but they rejected proposals to acquire a recreation ground or parish hall. See the entry for Hayes for the later detailed local history. On 1 April 1965 the parish was abolished. At the 1951 census (one of the last before the abolition of the parish), Harlington had a population of 15,946.

=== Sanitation ===
The chief task from 1872 for local government was the making of sewers in villages beyond a handful of homes such as this. Sewerage had been discussed in the vestry as long ago as 1864. The increase of population in the 20th century, growing preference for flush toilets and prohibitions on ground water contamination made the need for proper sanitation more urgent. In 1912, for instance, there were said to have been eleven cases of typhoid near the 'White Hart', and there was an outbreak of diphtheria in 1916.

During the 1920s the RDC made plans for constructing sewers, and the relative cost of their scheme and of schemes proposed by Hayes Urban District Council largely influenced the parish council's views on local government reorganisation. In the end the council seem to have acquiesced peacefully in the amalgamation with Hayes that took place in 1930, only on the grounds that this seemed to provide the best and cheapest chance of sewers being constructed soon. A sewerage scheme for the parish was completed by Hayes and Harlington Urban District Council in 1934.

== Present day ==
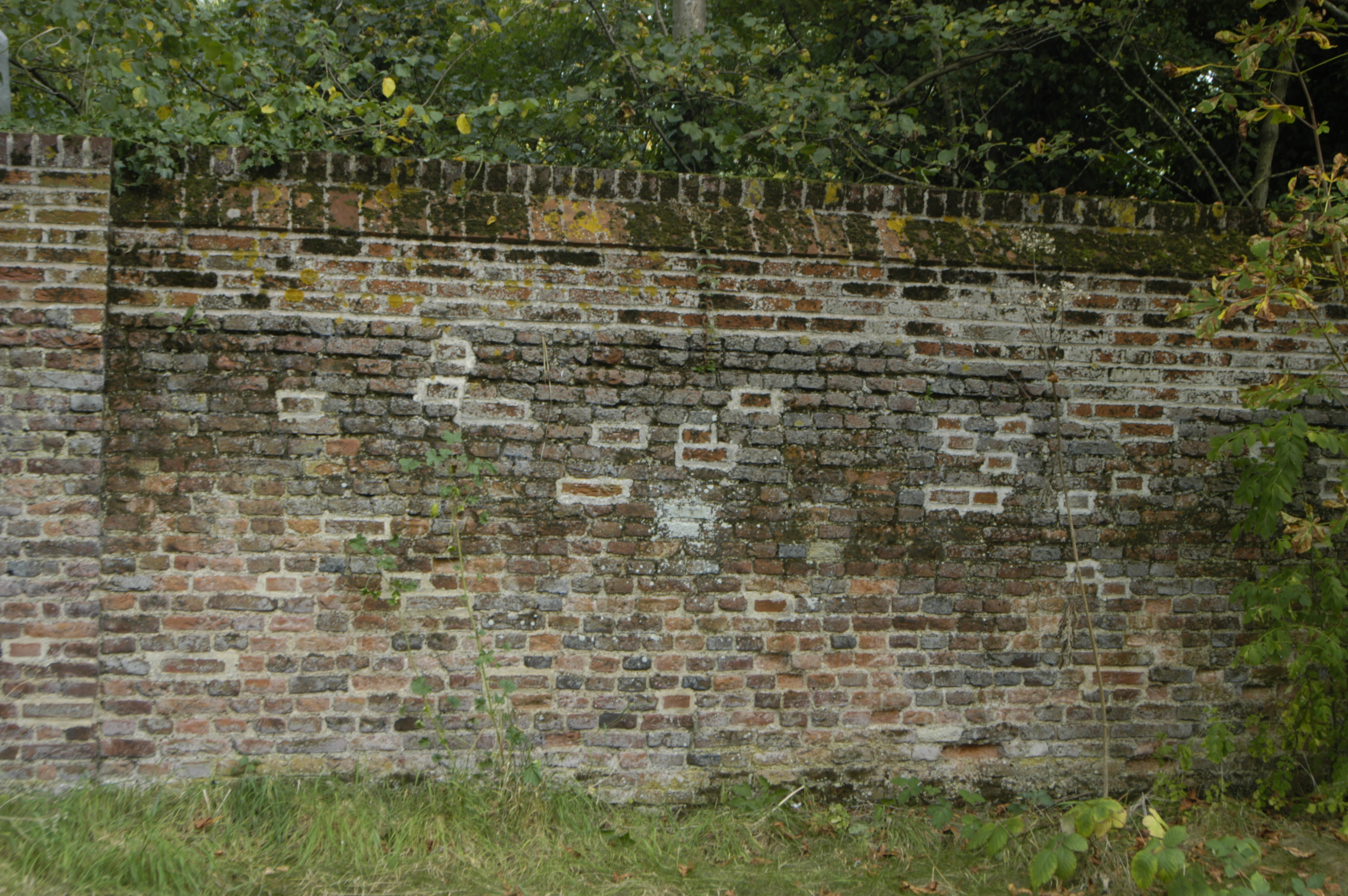
Northern end of the Parish: the Dawley Wall, from the inside, 2014.

Harlington Library is towards the north of the village/district.

The village contains six public houses: Captain Morgans', The Great Western, The Pheasant, The Red Lion, The Wheatsheaf, and The White Hart. There are two churches, a Baptist church and a Church of England church, St Peter & St Paul's. Schools include Harlington School.

Hellenic Imperial Airways has its United Kingdom offices in Axis House in Harlington. Harlington Locomotive Society on the High Street of the village - operates a trestle railway around the site of an old orchard. Harlington is covered by a community radio station: 91.8 Hayes FM, which is licensed with the national authority.

=== Churches ===
- S.S. Peter and Paul, contains, inter alia, sculpture by Edgar Boehm, Richard Cockle Lucas, William Theed and Inigo Thomas, and glass by Charles Eamer Kempe, Arthur Louis Moore and Thomas Willement.

The glebe was absorbed into the land of Sir John Bennet of Dawley, who held the benefice during the Interregnum.

== Gallery ==
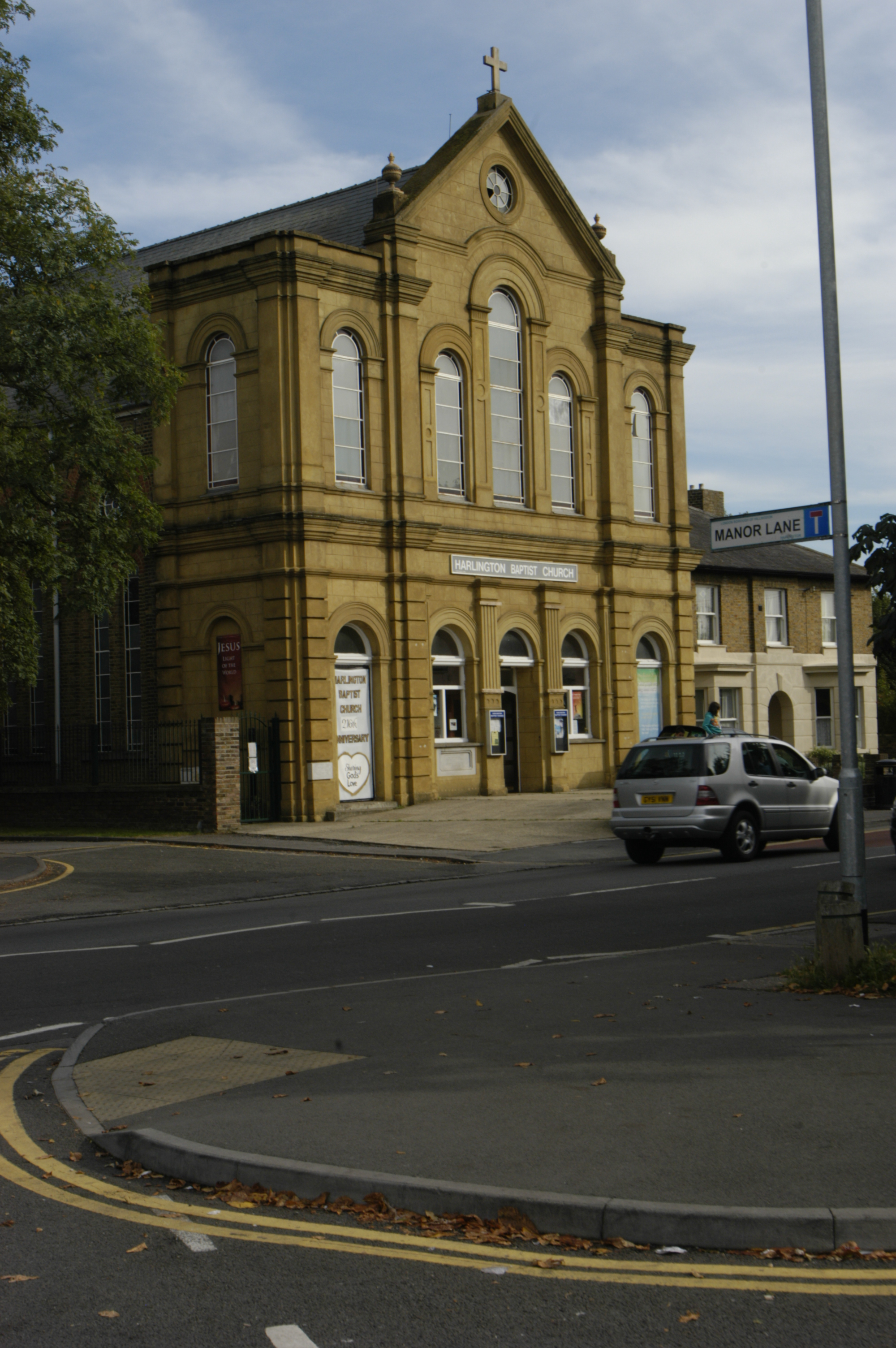
Harlington's Baptist Church, from the north-west, 2014.

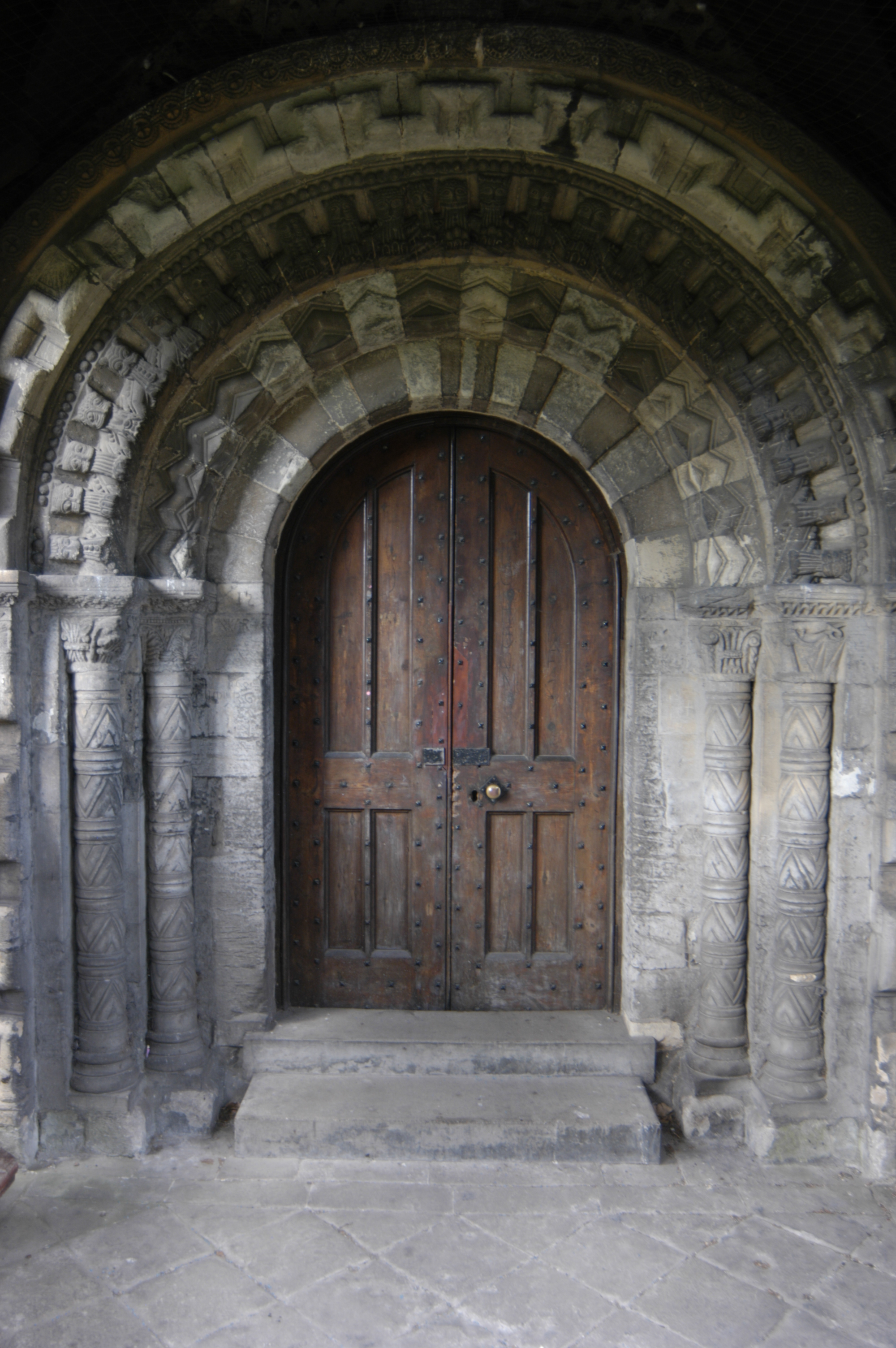
South portal and tympanum of the church of Saints Peter & Paul, Harlington.

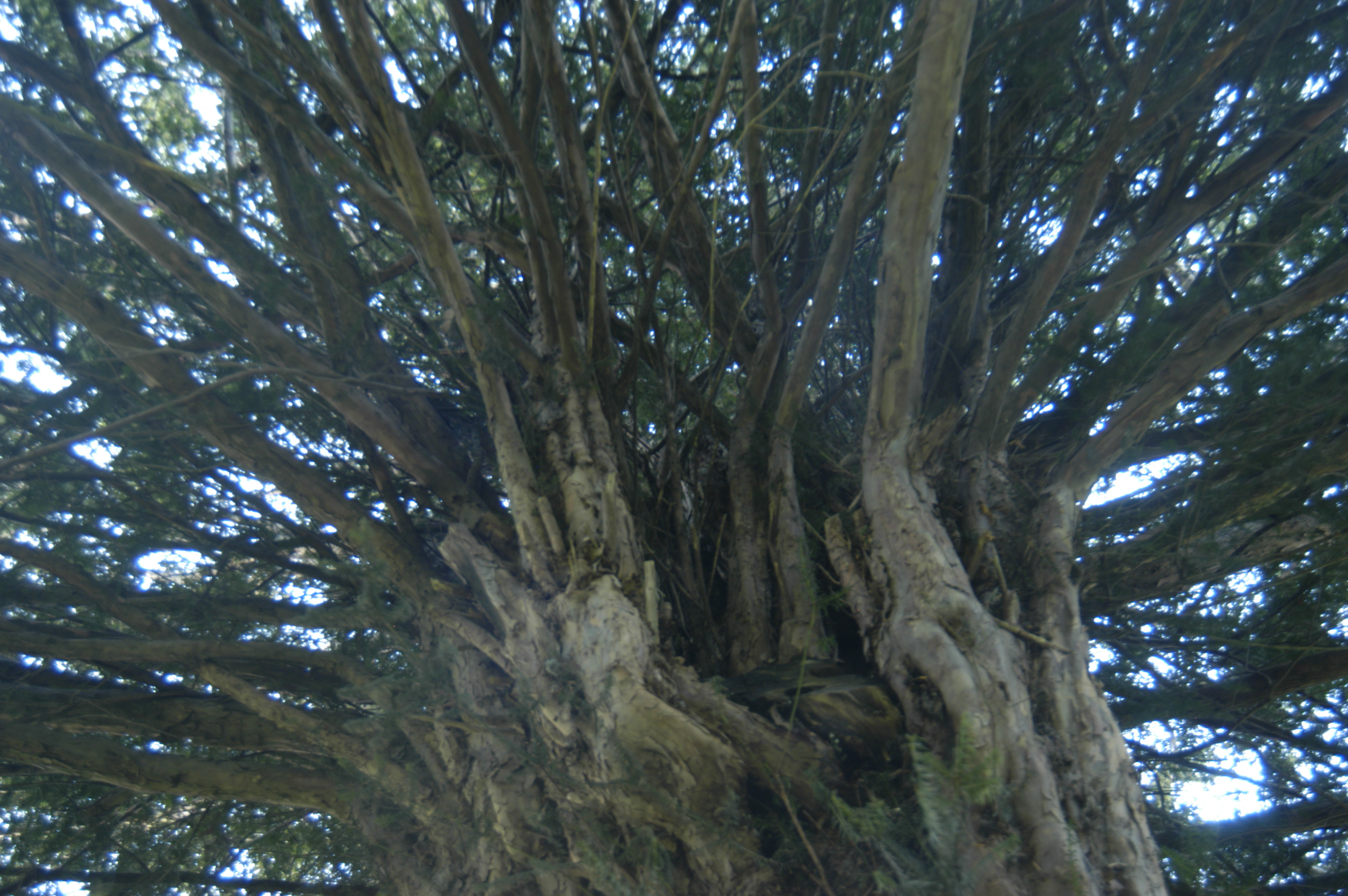
Underside of the famous yew in churchyard of church of S. Peter & S. Paul, Harlington, Middlesex, 2014.

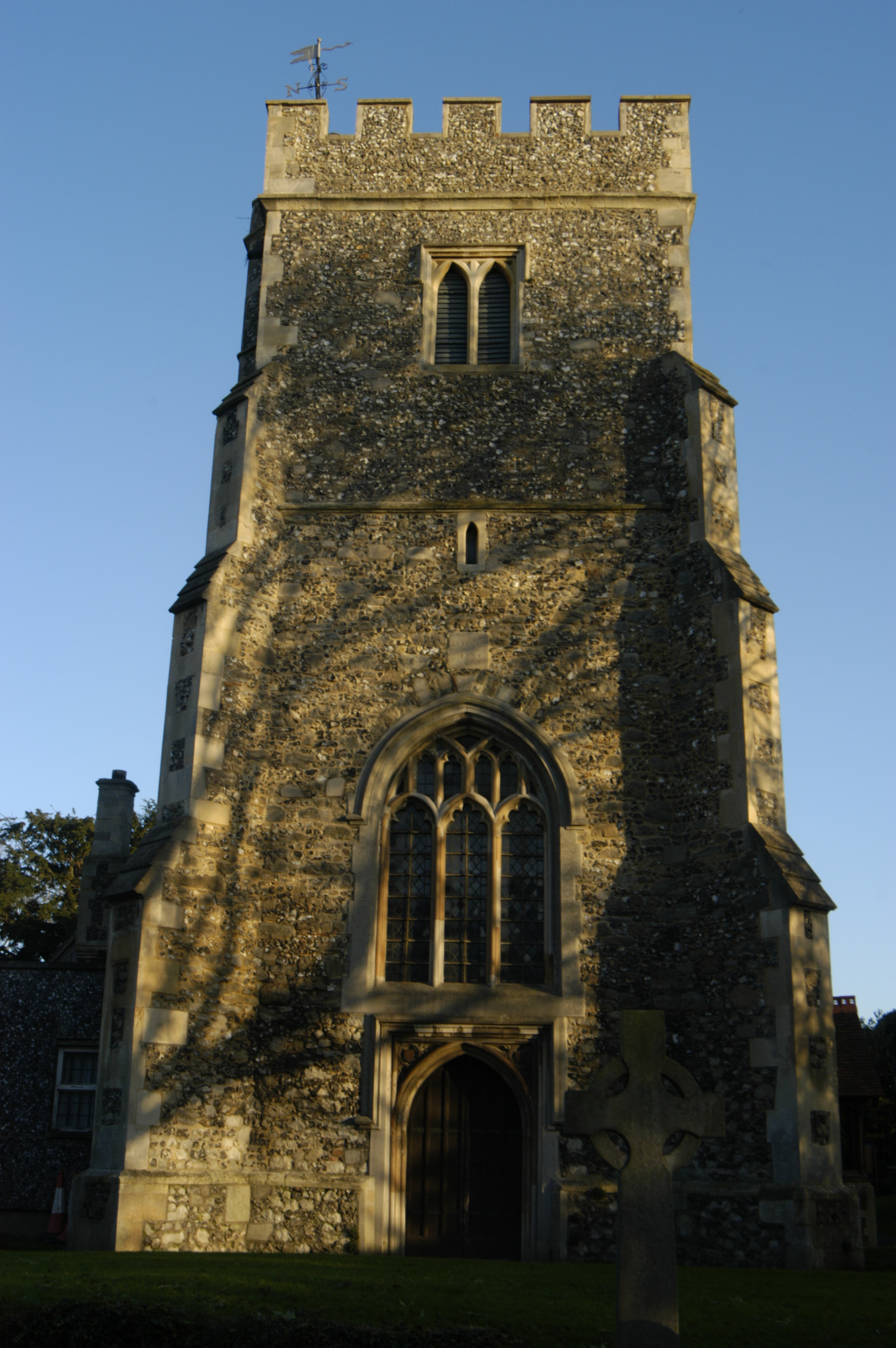
West end and tower of church of S. Peter & S. Paul, Harlington, 2014. Fifteenth century, restored c. 1880 by John Oldrid Scott.

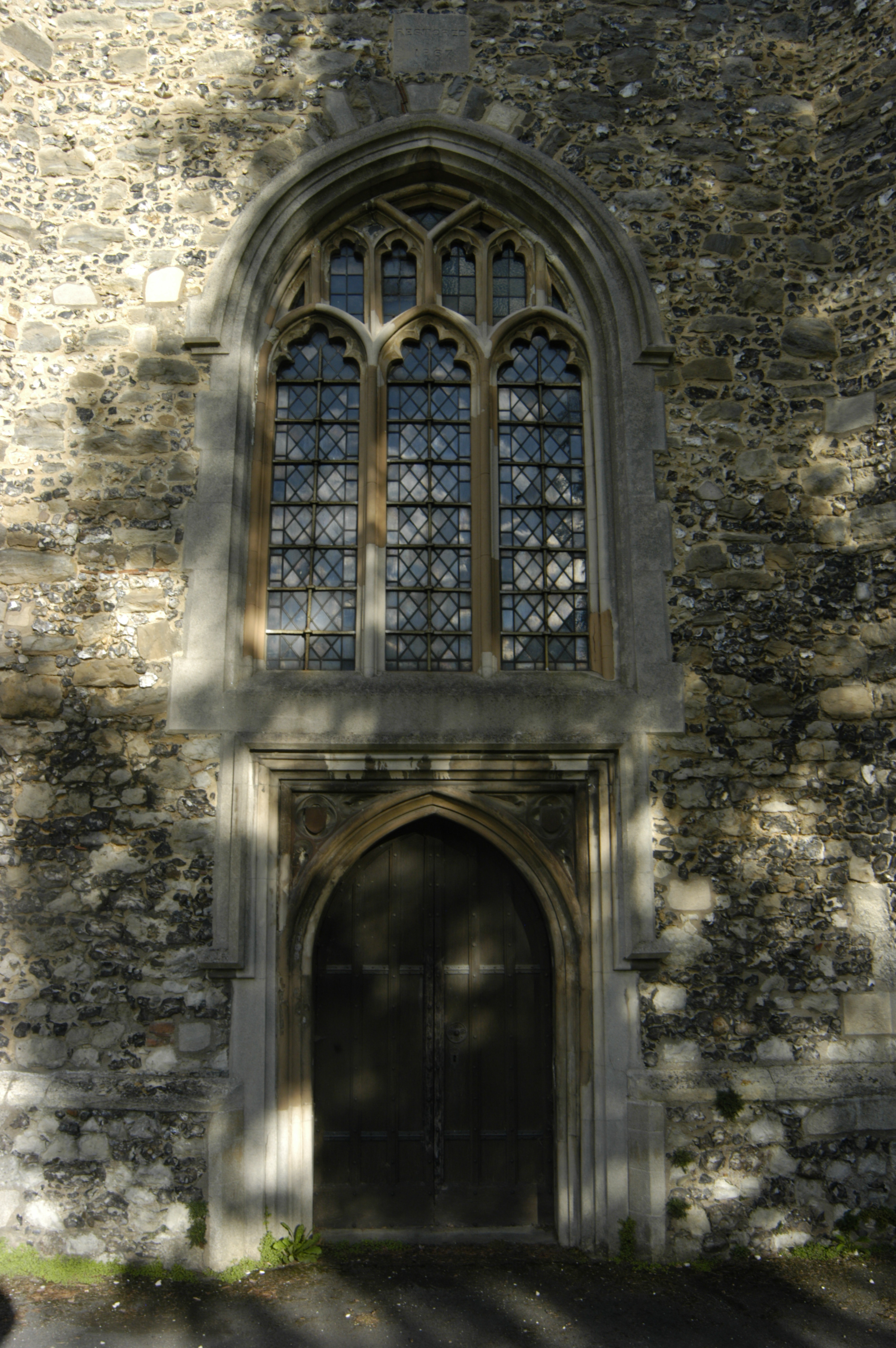
West end of SS. Peter & Paul.

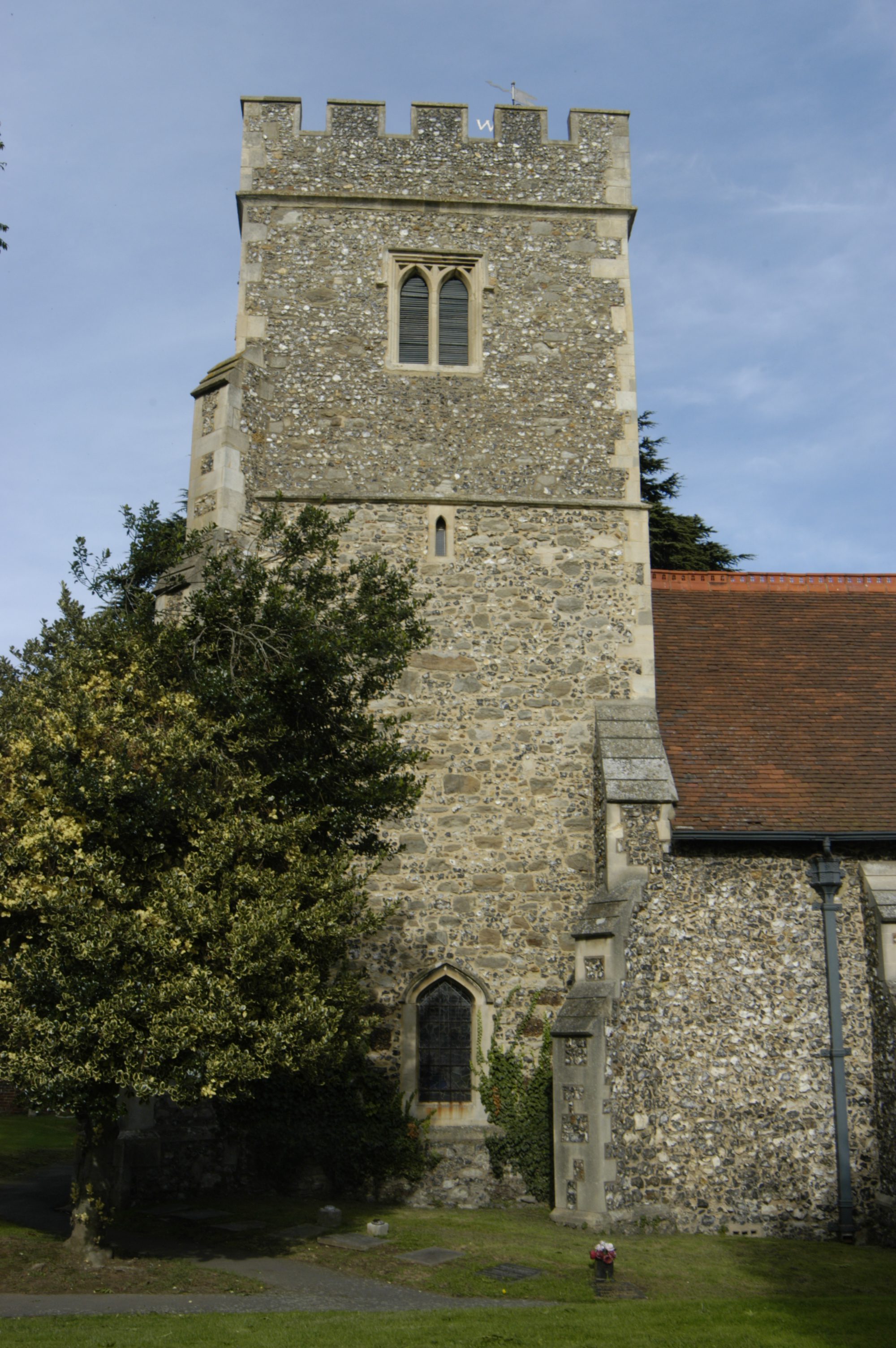
Tower of church of Saints Peter & Saint Paul, 2014, from the south.

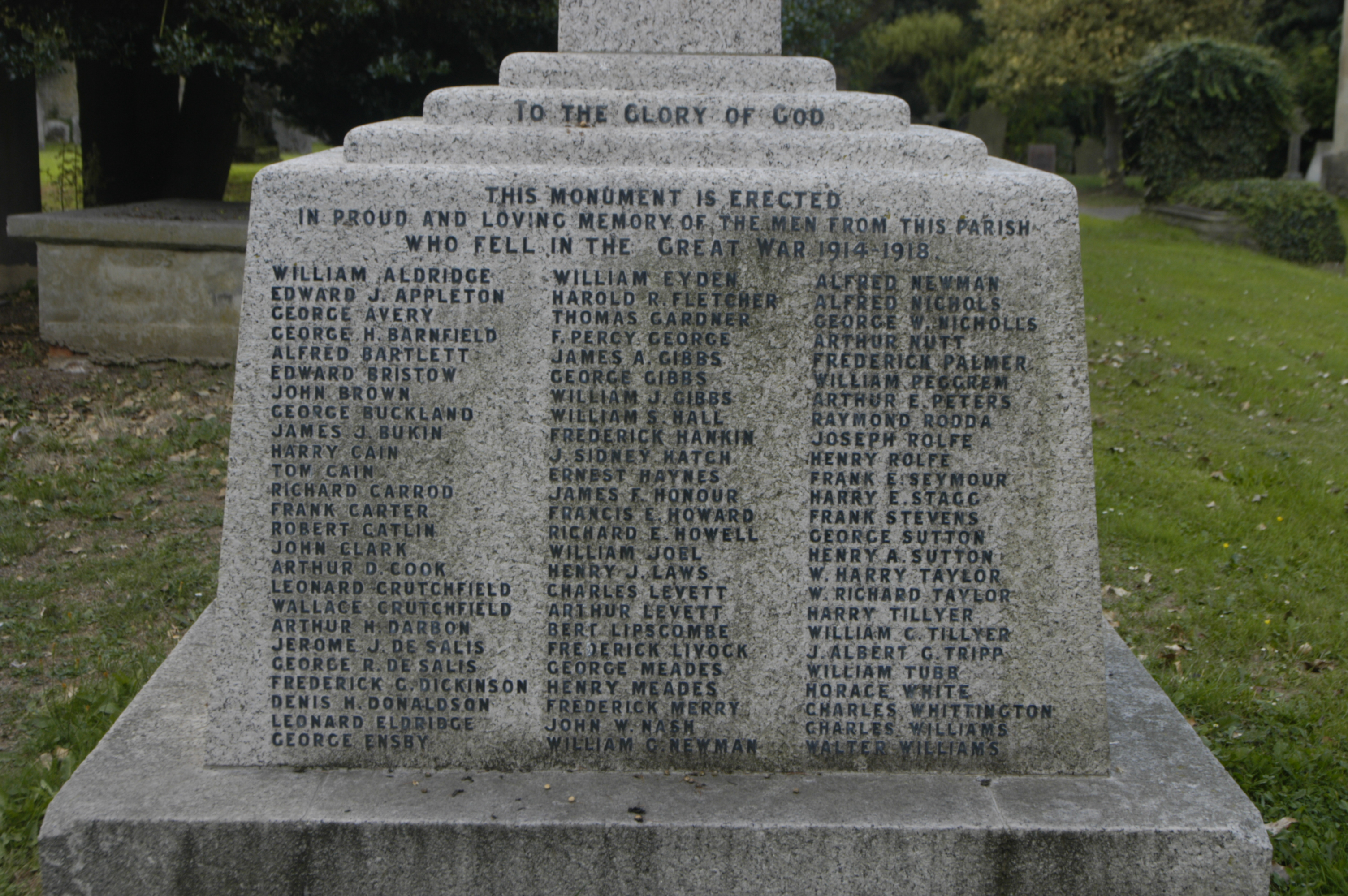
Harlington's war memorial, 1914-18 side.

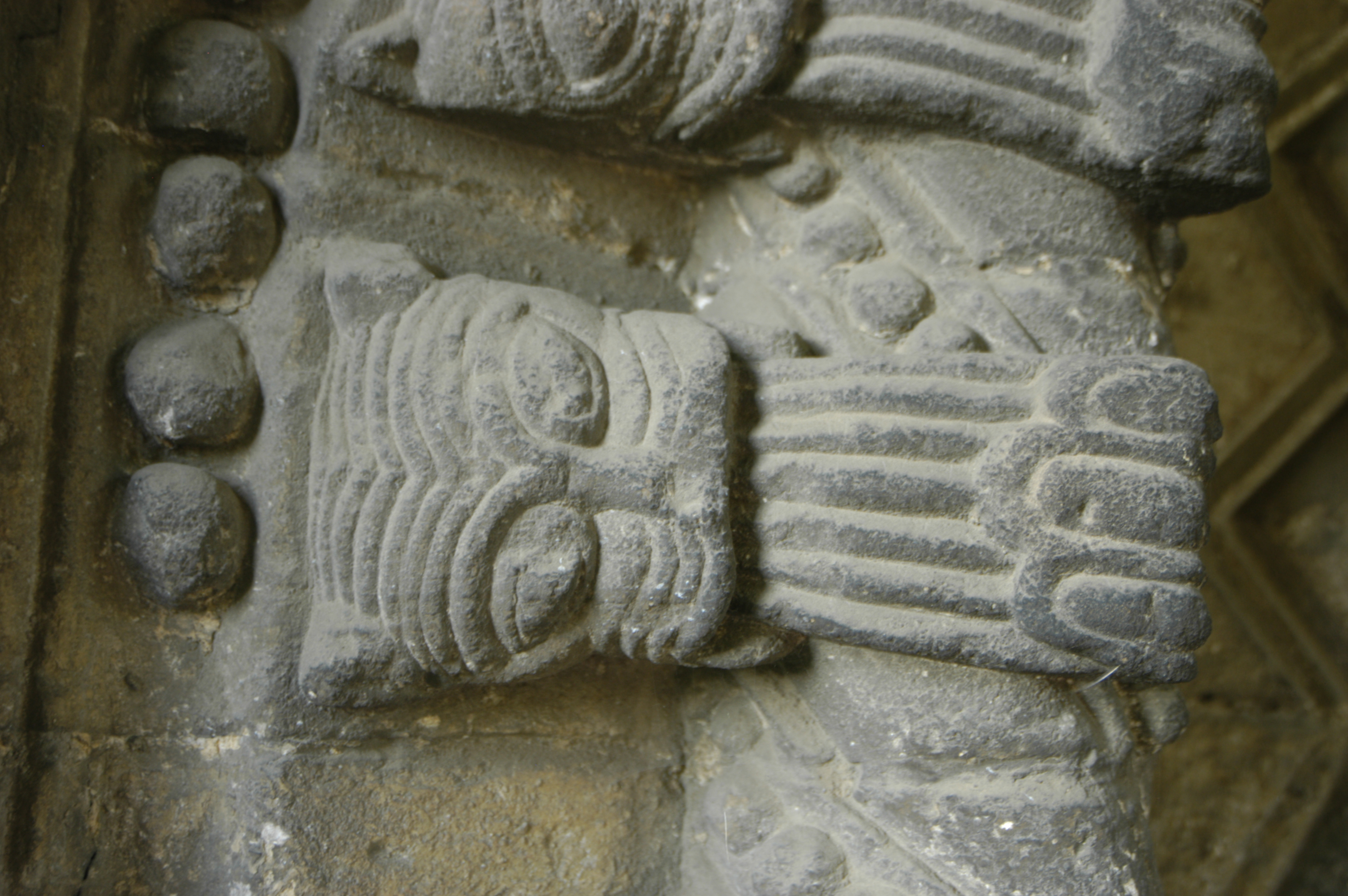
Detail of south portal of SS Peter & Paul. (2013).

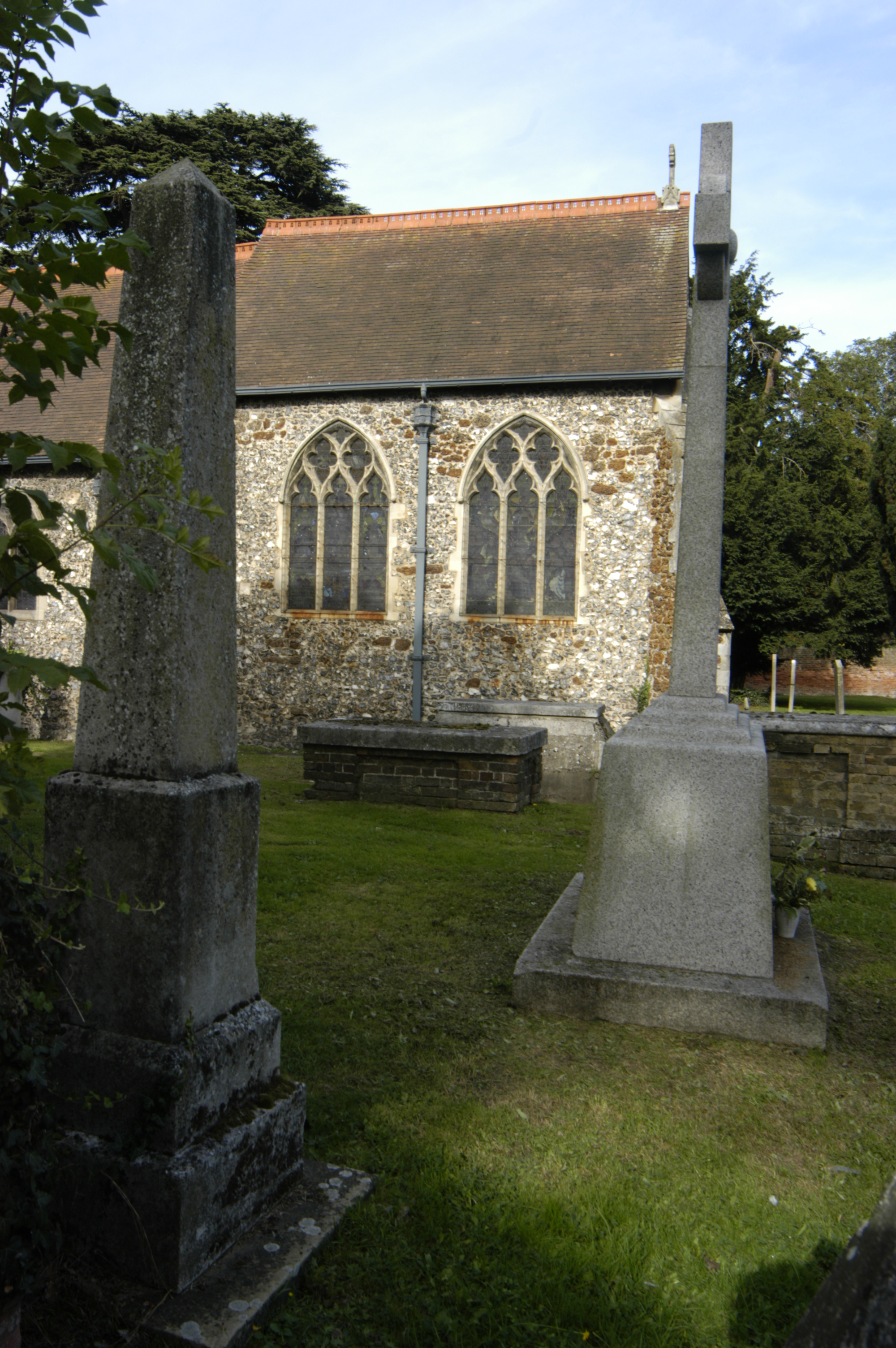
Side view of the chancel, an obelisk and the war memorial of Church of S.S. Peter & Paul, 2014.

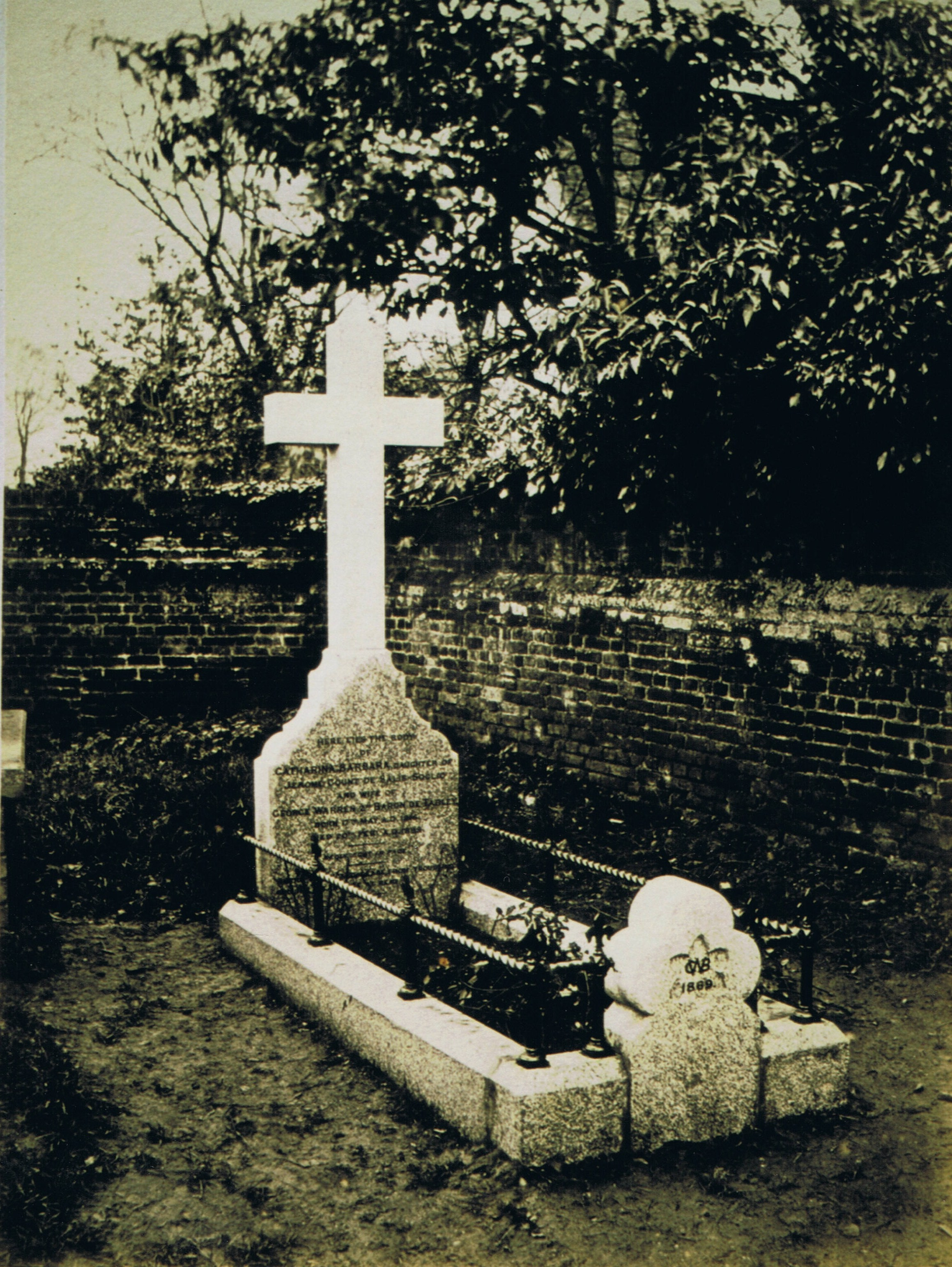
Grave of Catherina Barbara Warren, aka Lady De Tabley (d. 1869). Photo taken before 1881.

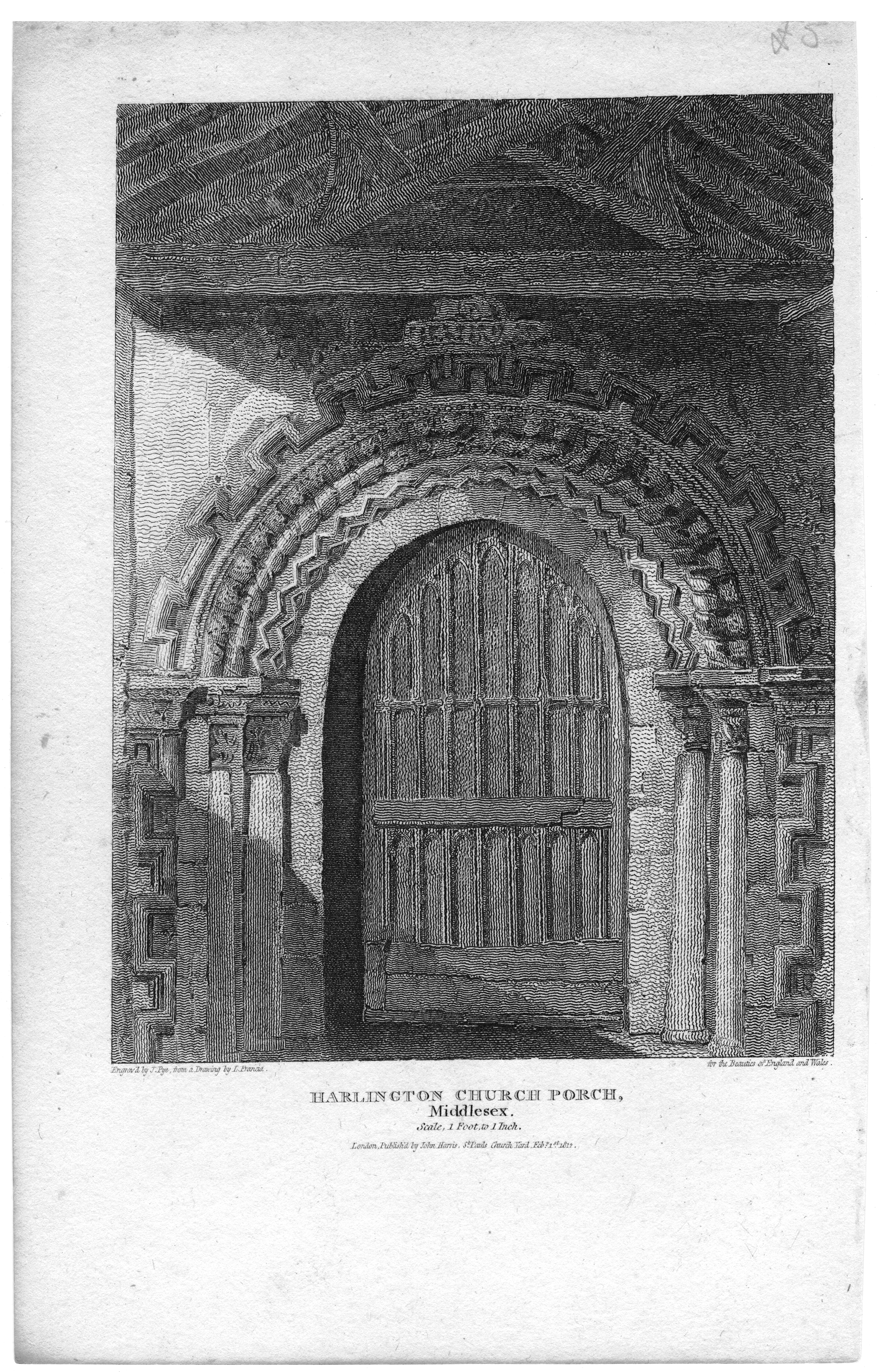
Harlington church's porch, engraved by John Pye, drawn by L. Francia, for the Beauties of England and Wales, 1812.

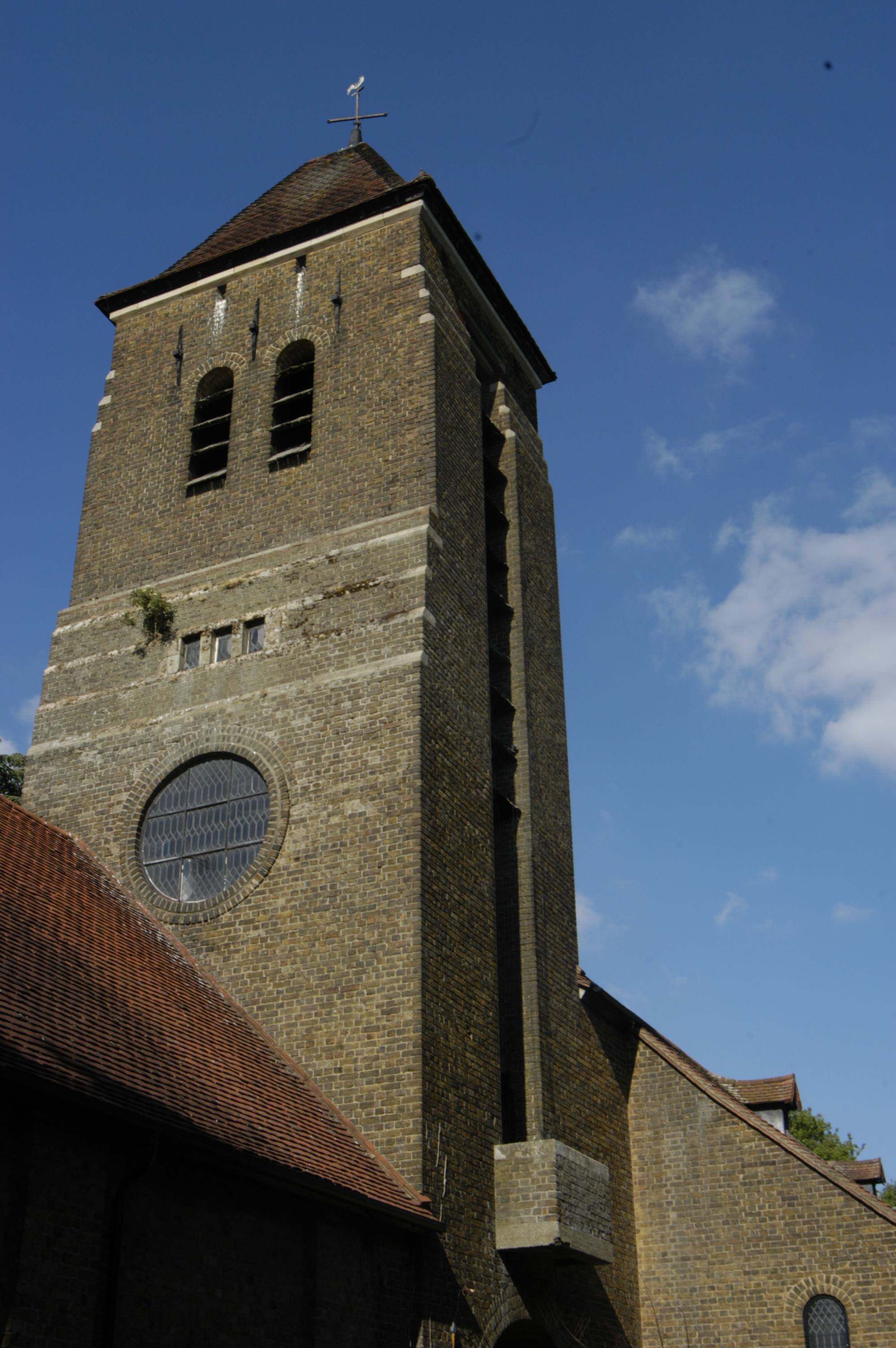
Church of St. Jerome, Dawley, (west Hayes), consecrated 1934, designed by Harold Gibbons, (in June 2015).

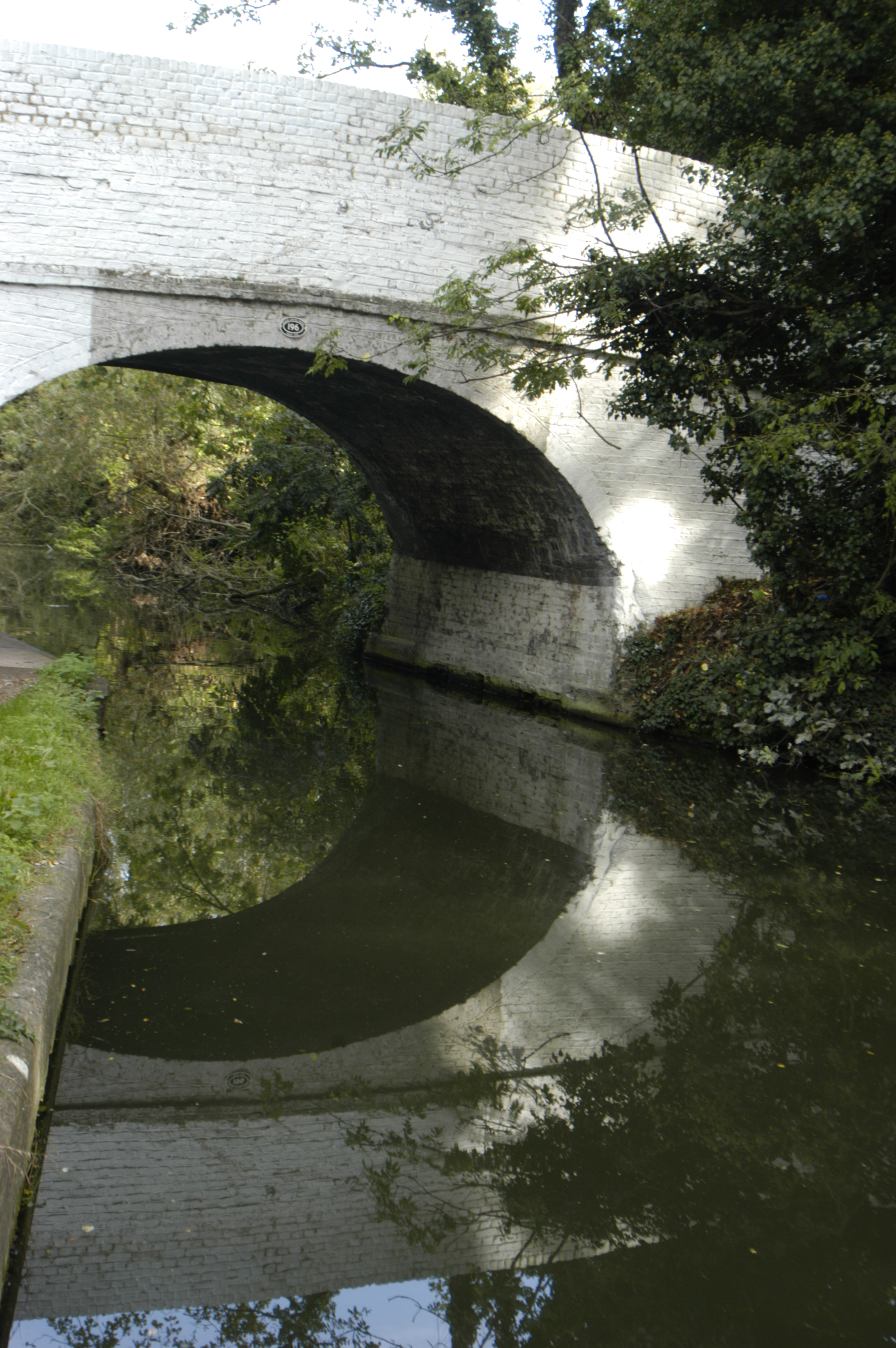
Bridge 196 over the Grand Union Canal at Dawley, Harlington

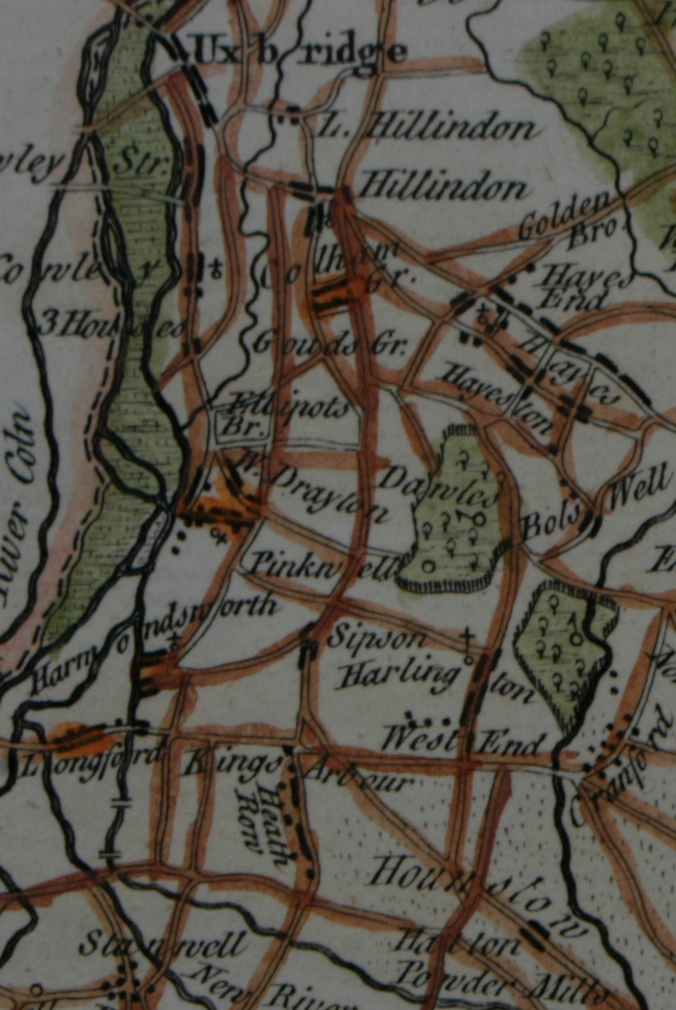
Part of a Thomas Kitchin map showing Dawley and Harlington, c. 1770.

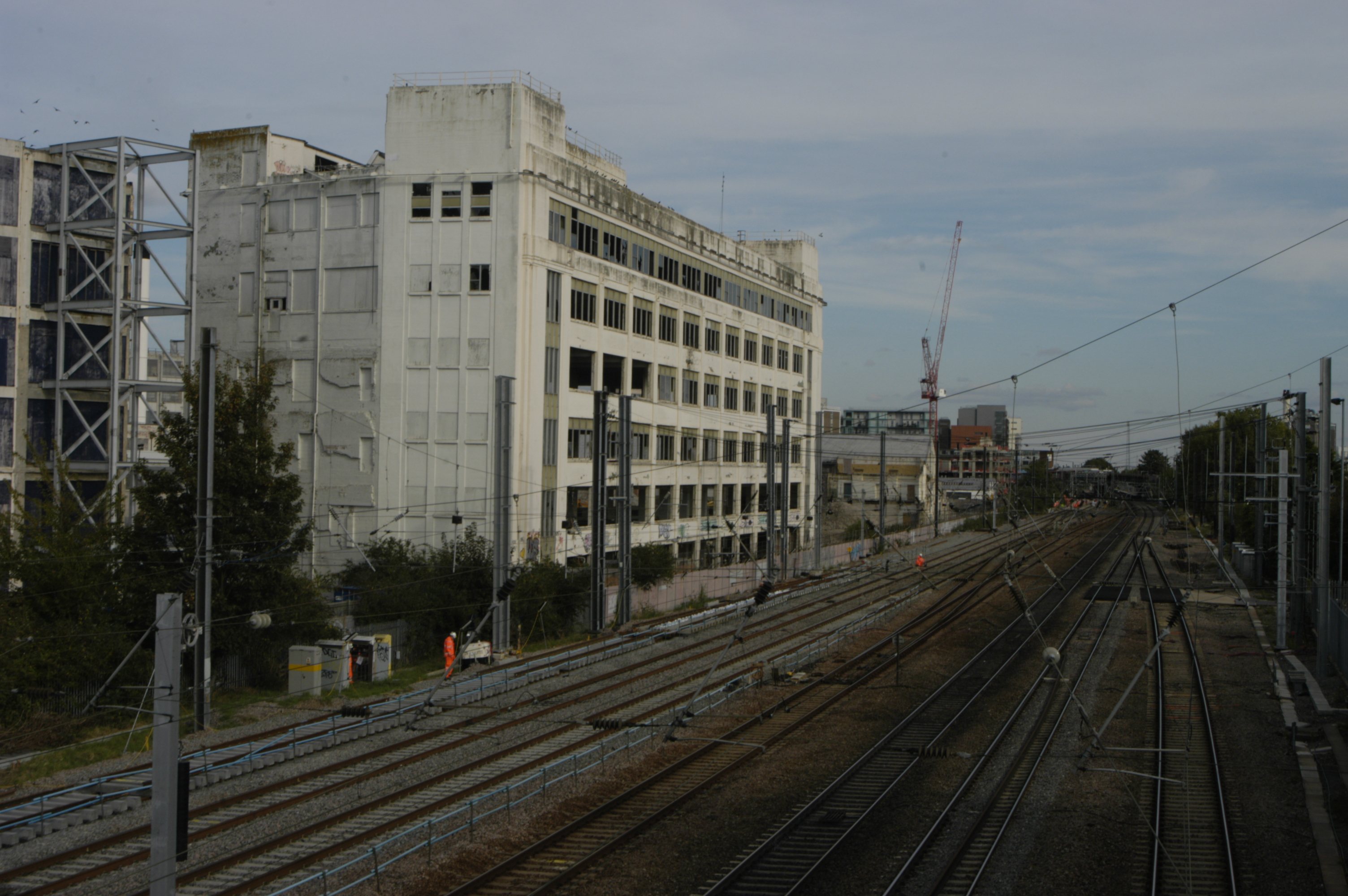
Great Western Railway and part of the former HMV & EMI factory at Harlington, looking east, 2014.

== Transport ==
Central London is 13.6 miles (21.9 km) east. The area is served by Hayes & Harlington railway station, served by Elizabeth Line trains from London Paddington, Shenfield and Abbey Wood to Heathrow Airport and Reading.

The following bus routes serve Harlington

- 81 Hounslow Bus Station - Slough
- 90 Feltham - Northolt
- 105 Greenford - Heathrow Central
- 111 Kingston - Heathrow Central
- 222 Hounslow Bus Station - Uxbridge
- 278 Heathrow Central - Ruislip
- 285 Kingston- Heathrow Central
- 423 Hounslow - Heathrow Terminal 5
- H98 Hounslow Bus Station - Hayes End
- N9 Heathrow Central - Aldwych
- N140 Heathrow Central - Harrow Weald
- SL7 Heathrow Central - West Croydon
- SL9 Heathrow Central - Harrow

== Historic transport ==
The Grand Junction Canal runs through the Dawley land, east to west: it was constructed c. 1794–1800. In the late 1830s the main line of the Great Western Railway was also built across the former Dawley Park (by then Dawley Wall Farm). However, Hayes & Harlington railway station (just outside the parish) was not opened until 1864. Before then there was a choice of the stations at West Drayton and Southall, or of the daily omnibus and weekly carrier to London.

A road going south-east towards Hatton was removed because of Heathrow's construction. The road along with Harlington High Street were formerly designated A312 until the 1950s.

== Former cottage hospital ==
The Harlington, Harmondsworth and Cranford Cottage Hospital, in Sipson Lane, opened in 1884, demolished and closed in 1977. Its site hosts a branch of the Sant Nirankari Satsang Bhawan.

=== Listed buildings ===
name	type	built	use and main features
Church of St. Peter & St. Paul (Grade One Listed)	Religious	12th century	Christian faith centre; the Harlington Yew, formerly probably the largest example of topiary in England, survives in the churchyard, unclipped
Veysey's Farm	Farm	late 18th century	Mixed agricultural/nature
Shackle's Barn	Agricultural	early 1800s	Scouts headquarters & Shackles Family chapel (cross inset at front apex)
Barn at Manor Farm	Agricultural		Restored in the 1970s, used as offices, timber-framed
Small hospital (Sipson Lane)	Social	1884	Hindu faith centre.
Dower House (High Street)	House	16th century	Timber framed building
Harlington Baptist Church	Religious	1879	Christian faith centre.

=== Former listed buildings in the parish ===
name	type	built	demolished (exact or between dates)	use
Dawley Manor Farm	House	17th century	1962	M4 motorway and part of St Peter's Way
Shackle's House	House	early 1800s	1960–70	Pembury Court (street)
Harlington rectory	House	Victorian	1970	Homes and the new church hall
Old Church Hall	Church hall	early 1900s	1970	Was in rectory grounds. Houses.
Bletchmore House	House	1970–80	Bletchmore Close	
Woodlands Farmhouse	House	1960–65	178-182 High Street	
Poplar House	House	18th century	1970–75	Felbridge Court (apartments)

Manor Farm was demolished between 1930 and 1940 and pre-dated the possibility of statutory listing. It is the site of shops in Manor Parade and adjoining residential roads.

== Notable people ==
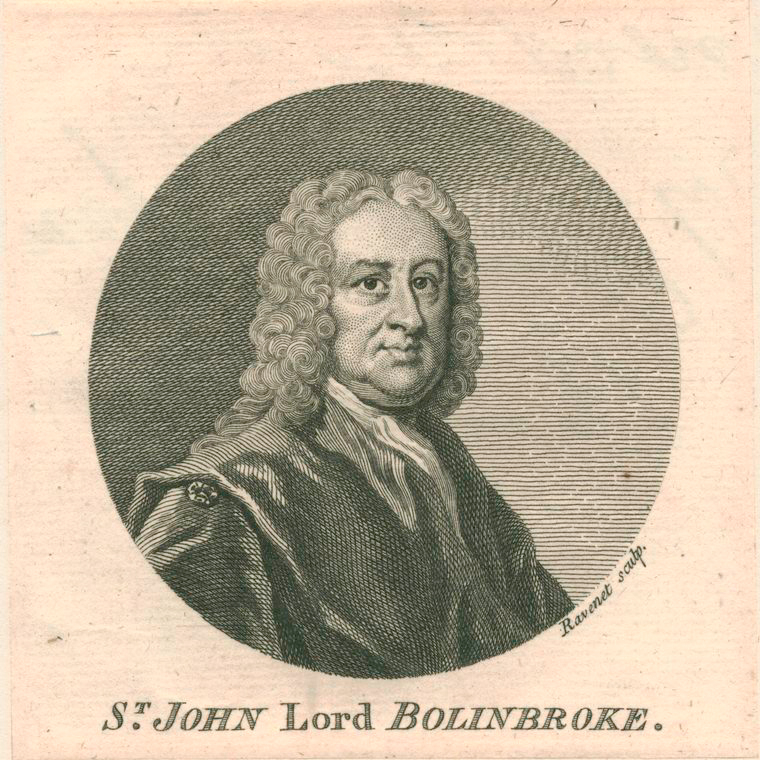
Henry St John, 1st Viscount Bolingbroke. He bought Dawley in 1724 and sold it in 1737, or 1738.

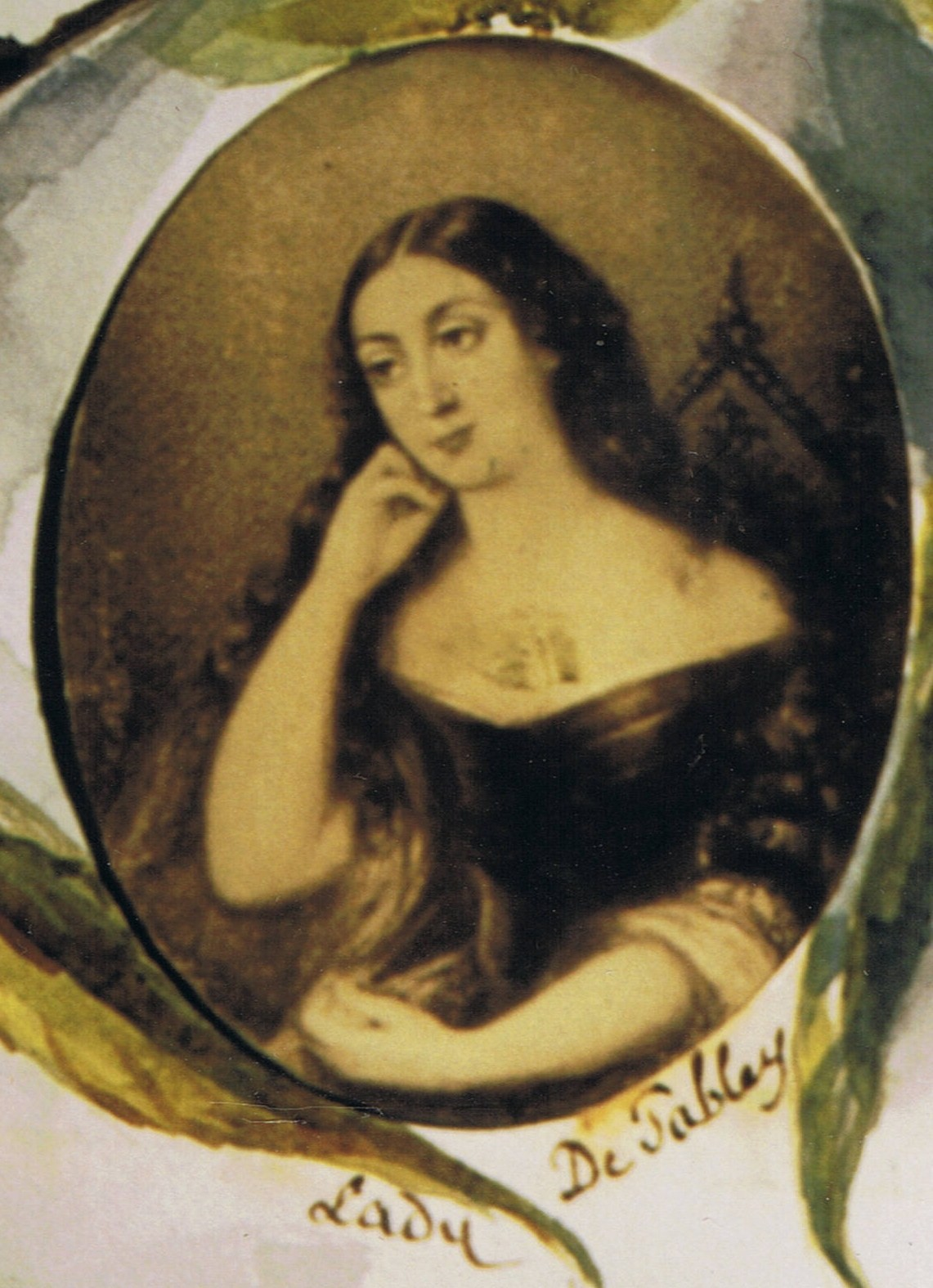
Lady De Tabley is buried alongside her eldest daughter in the SS Peter & Paul graveyard.

- John Derby Allcroft, glove manufacturer and philanthropist. Lived at Harlington Lodge;
- English statesman Henry Bennet, 1st Earl of Arlington (1618–1685), part of Charles II's Cabal, was born in (and took his title from) Harlington. And his elder brother Sir John Bennet, KB, 1st Lord Ossulston. Their grandfather was Sir John Bennet (died 1627), who had bought the manor of Dawley from the heirs of Sir Ambrose Coppinger in 1607. In 1649 Sir John Bennet owned around 600 acres (2.4 km^{2}) of the parish including Dawley House and four farm-houses. In 1692 the family estate measured around 540 acres, and 602 in the early 18th century. Charles Bennet, 2nd Earl of Tankerville sold the manor of Dawley in 1725; A monumental inscription in the church features Sir John Bennet, KB, Lord Ossulston, and his wives Elizabeth, daughter of Lionel Cranfield, 1st Earl of Middlesex and widow of Edmund Sheffield, 2nd Earl of Mulgrave (died 1658), along with his second wife Bridget, daughter of John Howe;
- Sir Michael Stanhope, (c. 1549 – c. 1621), groom of the privy chamber, was granted the manor by the Crown in 1599. It passed to his son-in-law, George, Lord Berkeley, and thence by descent, inter alia, to Lord Berkeley, of Cranford;
- Politician and philosopher, Henry St John, 1st Viscount Bolingbroke (1678–1751), of Dawley House. Alexander Pope describes his friend Bolingbroke, the noble farmer who had engaged a painter for £200 to give the correct agricultural air to his country hall by ornamenting it with trophies of spades, rakes, and prongs. Bolingbroke bought Dawley for £22,000 in 1724, moved there in 1725. With help from Charles Bridgeman he worked on the 400 acres of park and 20 acres of garden, making a ferme ornée, while James Gibbs beautified the house. He sold it in 1737, or 1738, for £26,0000 to Edward Stephenson (1691–1768), MP for Sudbury 1734–41, and for two days Governor of Fort William, 1728, who passed it on again soon after 1748;
- Dame Lettice Poyntz (died c. 1610), aka Laetitia FitzGerald, niece of the fair Geraldine and sister of Gerald FitzGerald, 14th Earl of Kildare, first wife Sir Ambrose Coppinger, of Dawley, (c. 1546 – 1604), MP for Ludgershall in 1586. She married secondly John Morice, MP, (1568–1618), aka Sir John Poyntz. She left £100 to the village, eighty pounds of which was later used to purchase six acres of land the income from which was to support good causes in the parish;,
- Henry Paget, 2nd Earl of Uxbridge (1719–1769), of Dawley House. His heir Lord Paget sold it c. 1772;

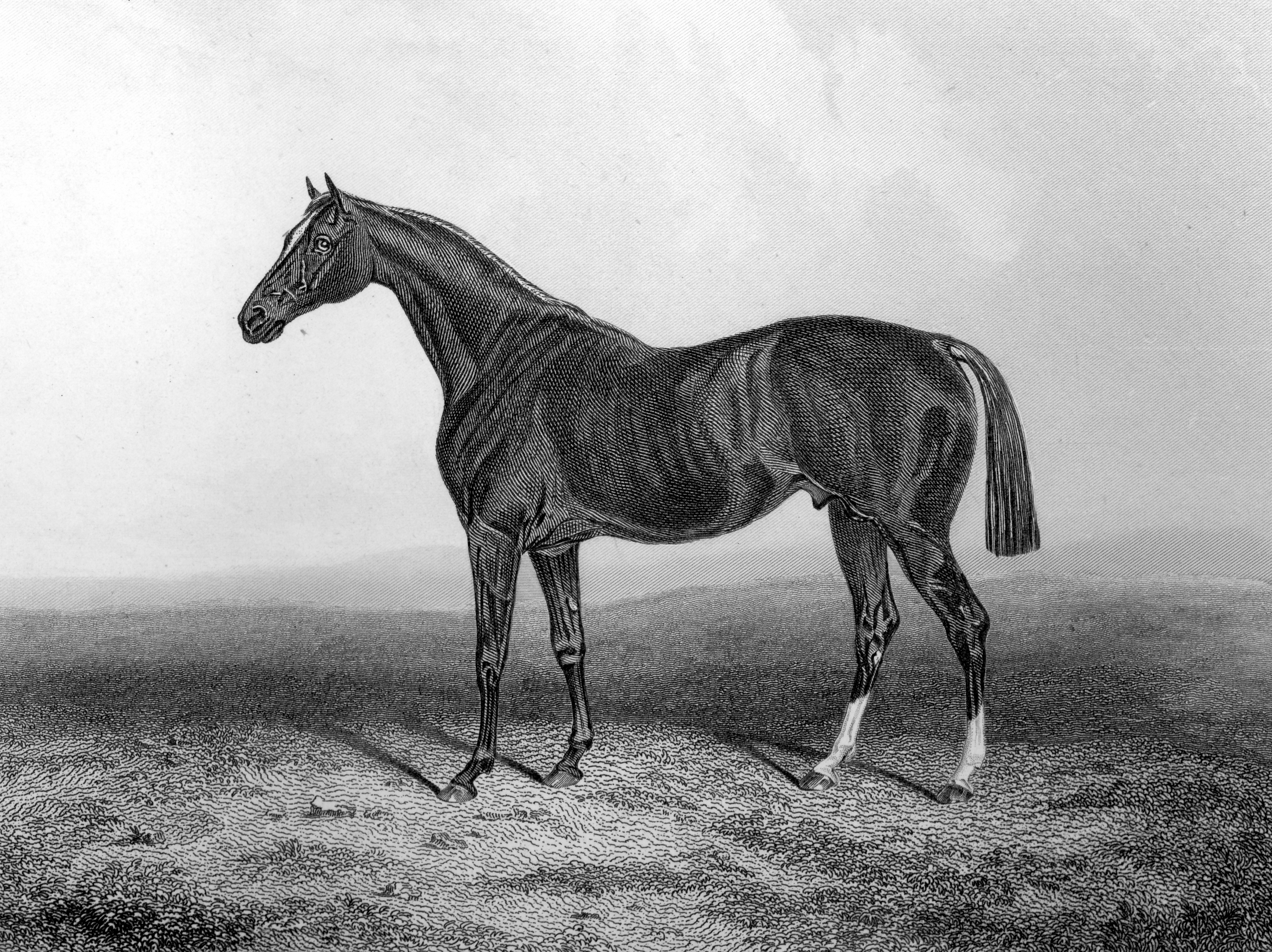
Tattersall's stallion Glencoe stood at Dawley in 1835.

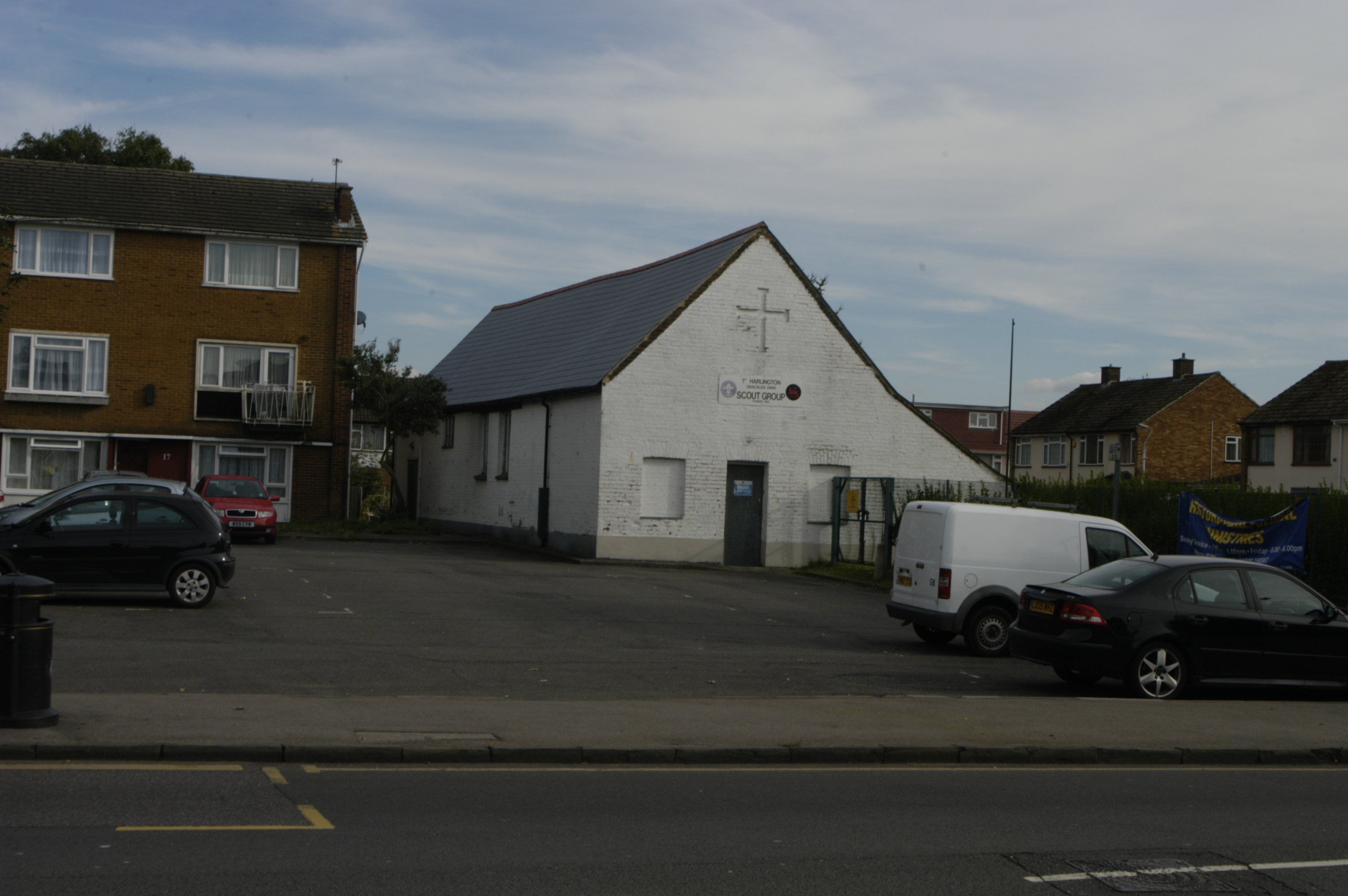
Shackle's Barn, Harlington, Middlesex, from the west, October 2014.

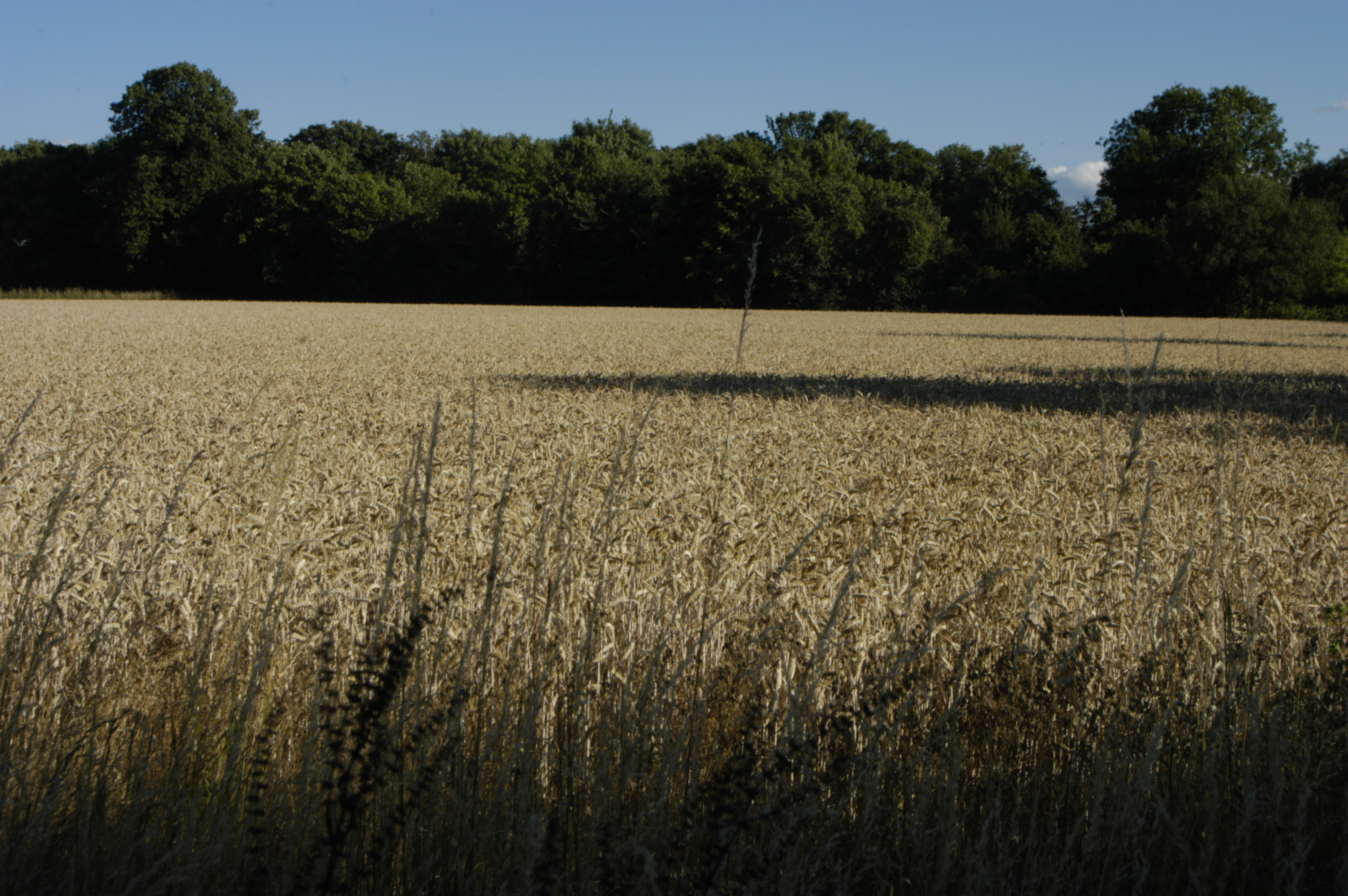
Wheat field beside the M4, once part of Dawley Manor Farm, at Harlington. July 2015. Looking to the south-east.

- Founder of Tattersalls, Richard Tattersall (1724–1795), c. 1779 began a stud farm at Dawley (aka Dawley House) which was called Dawley Wall Farm. In the 1830s this was described as '13 miles from London, 3 from Uxbridge, 1 from Hayes and 2 from Cranford Bridge'. Coincidentally, in 1779 Tattersall bought for £2500, for the purpose of breeding, 2nd Lord Bolingbroke's unbeaten Highflyer. Operations at Dawley were continued after his death by various other Tattersalls including his son George I (1792–1853), and perhaps grandson George II (1817–1849): thoroughbred stallion Glencoe (1831–1857) stood at stud there in 1835. Middleton, the 1825 Derby winner, was there in 1832. Sire Sir Hercules was sent there in 1833 and The Colonel in c. 1837.
- Composer William Byrd (1539/40-1623) lived as a Catholic recusant in Harlington, 1578–88, or 17 years;
- Sports impresario Simon Clegg was born in Harlington;
- Former professional footballer and football manager Paul Goddard was born in Harlington;
- Rev. Count Henry Jerome de Salis, DD, FRS, third son of the Jerome, 2nd Count de Salis, was appointed by his parents Game keeper of and for their said manor of Dally otherwise Dawley, near Hayes, Middlesex, from 13 June 1775; His mother, the Hon. Mary Fane, later Madame de Salis, and then Countess de Salis (died 1785), had lived for a while in central Harlington in c. 1770, and then his parents seem to have purchased the Dawley Wall estate (now approximately Stockley Park and more), including Dawley House or its remains, from the heirs of Lord Uxbridge in 1772. Henry Jerome, his daughter, wife, parents, one brother, and nephew were all buried in the family vault in Harlington's churchyard. Peter de Salis (1738-1807) acquired the site of Dawley House in 1797. In 1841 members of the de Salis family (Peter Fane de Salis (1799-1870) and his step-mother and half-brothers) owned together 533 acres in the parish. Most of this lay in the north, in or near the former park, but it also included Dawley Manor Farm, in the High Street, The Gramophone Company (then Electric and Musical Industries Ltd.) acquired the site of Dawley House from Cecil Fane de Salis for an extension to their works across the road in 1929;
- Jerome, 4th Count de Salis-Soglio (1771–1836), Anglo-Irish visionary, lived (and is buried) in Harlington, and his son W. Fane De Salis and grandsons J.F.W. de Salis and Sir Cecil Fane De Salis, KCB;
- John Kyte, (died 1537), Rector of Harlington until 1510, and then Bishop of Carlisle from 1520;
- 17th-century churchman John Pritchett (died 1681) lived in and was rector of Harlington during the Commonwealth period. He was Bishop of Gloucester from 1672 to 1681;
- William Roper (c. 1496 – 1578), husband of Margaret Roper, thus son-in-law of Sir and Saint Thomas More; with his second son, Anthony, Lords of the manor, 1551–83;
- Roger, Earl of Shrewsbury, Lord of the Manor in 1086; and his son Robert of Bellême c. 1102;
- Rev. Dr. Joseph Trapp, (1679–1747), rector of Harlington, 1733–48, (also an academic, poet and pamphleteer);
- Ovine scientist Eric Underwood (1905–1980) was born in Harlington;
- Wigot of Wallingford, Lord of the Manor at the time of Edward the Confessor.
- Political supporter of Bolingbroke, Sir William Wyndham of Orchard Wyndham in Somerset, married in Harlington church the Rt. Hon. Maria Catherina, Marchioness of Blandford, the daughter of Peter de Jong, a Burgomaster of Utrecht, on 1 June 1734;
- Chelsea (1970s until July 2005), Queens Park Rangers (2005-2023) and Wycombe Wanderers (from 2024-) football clubs have used the Imperial College Sports Ground, (aka Harlington Sports Ground), just west of the village in Sipson Lane.

== Sport ==
A greyhound racing track was opened during the 1930s, off the Bath Road. The racing was independent (that is, not affiliated to the National Greyhound Racing Club, the sport's governing body) and was therefore a flapping track (the nickname given to independent tracks). In 1959 plans for two large hotels, the Skyways (now Sheraton) and the Ariel (now Holiday Inn), to serve Heathrow were revealed, which resulted in the track being demolished: the last meeting was on 22 January 1962. The track stood very near to where the Holiday Inn is today.

== Sources ==
- Harlington and Harmondsworth, by Philip Sherwood, Tempus, Stroud, 2002;
- The History of Dawley (Middlesex), by B.T. White, Hayes and Harlington Local History Society, 2001;
- Victorian Harlington, Hayes and Harlington Local History Society, 1985;
- De Salis Family : English Branch, by Rachel E. Fane De Salis, Higgs & Co., Henley-on-Thames, UK, 1934.
- Eight Hundred Years of Harlington Parish Church in the County of Middlesex, Herbert Wilson, MA, Rector, Uxbridge, 1909.
- An Historical Account of Those Parishes in the County of Middlesex, Which Are Not Described in the Environs of London, by the Rev. Daniel Lysons, London, 1800, pp. 125–135.
