= Harlington Locomotive Society =

Trestle railway in Harlington, England

Coordinates: 51°29′18.6″N 0°26′3.92″W

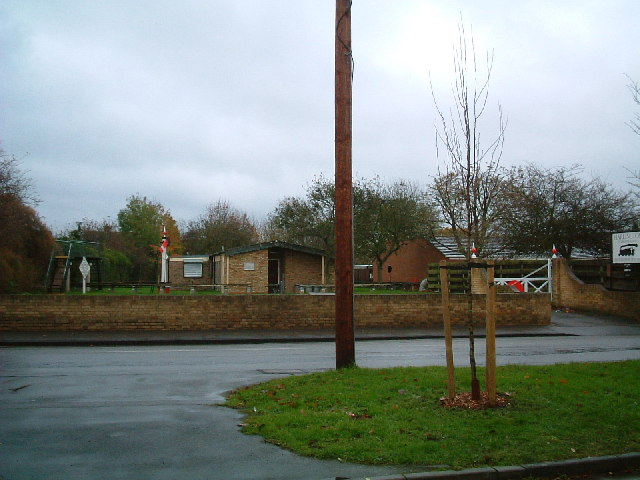
The society grounds in 2005 as viewed from the street

The Harlington Locomotive Society is a railway society that operates a miniature steam railway about 1/2 mile (0.80 km) in length through an old orchard in the village of Harlington, London Borough of Hillingdon, Greater London. The model railway was first started by Charles Shackle in 1927 and the society was officially founded in 1949.

== History ==
The origins of the society were in 1927 when Charles Shackle, a former employee of the Great Western Railway, constructed a model railway in an orchard next to his house, and invited the public to help him; The society itself was founded in 1949. The society benefitted from the local presence of many engineering firms, such as EMI, the Aeolian Company, and the Fairey Aviation Company, as well as its close proximity to Heathrow Airport.

Having closed, the model railway was reopened on 17 April 1954. Among the many events it runs for charity, the society hosted the annual charity day for the Diabeticare unit at Hillingdon Hospital on 25 May 2014 and 24 May 2016. As well as events held in the club house, visitors could ride on the model railway. In 2020, the society exhibited their locomotives at the London Model Engineering Exhibition at Alexandra Palace.

== Operation ==
External videos
- A ride around the loop in 2012

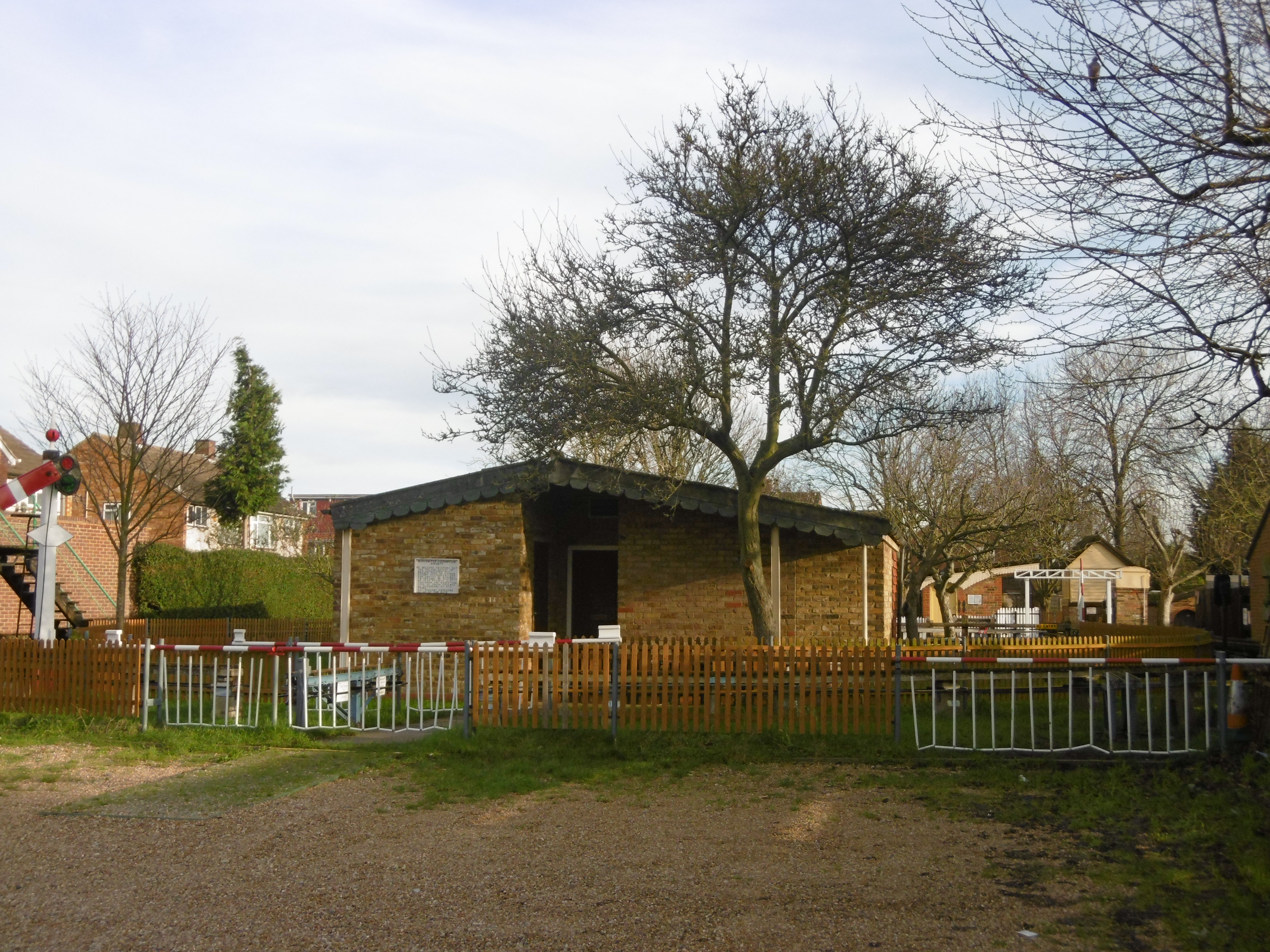
The society grounds in 2016, showing the clubhouse, track, and a semaphore signal

The society is situated in Harlington in the London Borough of Hillingdon, close to Heathrow Airport. The model railway is in the shape of a loop, with the sidings in the middle. The total length of track is about 1/2 mile (0.80 km). The railway has steam, diesel, and battery locomotives, but it is primarily operated as a steam railway. The line has a single tunnel, and one station, which was called Orchard Halt in the 1950s, but had been renamed to Harlington High Street by 2014.

Besides the railway there is a club house, set in a shed building, which operates as a tearoom. It contains a small museum about railway history, and it is wheelchair accessible. The society holds open days where they give rides to children; the average ride lasts around one minute. As of 2014, the railway was open to the public twice a month between Easter and October, with an at-least similar arrangement still the case in 2020. The price of a single ride was 40p in 2010, 50p in 2012 and 2014, and 60p in 2016.
