= Swynnerton (surname) =

Swynnerton is an English surname. Notable people with the surname include:

- Annie Swynnerton, English painter
- Charles Francis Massy Swynnerton, English naturalist
- Humphrey Swynnerton, English politician
- Sir John de Swynnerton, English law enforcement official (14th century)
- John de Swynnerton, English law enforcement official (14th century)
- Sir John Swynnerton, English politician and merchant taylor
- John Swynnerton (c.1349-c.1427), English politician (and maybe law enforcement official (14th century))
- John Swynnerton, English law enforcement official (16th century)
- Margaret Swynnerton, daughter of Humphrey that married into the Vernon family of Sudbury and Hilton

== See also ==
- Swynnerton Hall
- Swinnerton
