= Simon Clegg =

British sports businessman (born 1959)

- Born: 11 August 1959 (age 66)
- Occupation: Chief Executive of the British Olympic Association

Simon Paul Clegg CBE (born 11 August 1959) is a British sports businessmen. He has been Chief Executive of the British Olympic Association, a Championship Football Club, Ipswich Town FC and a European Youth Olympic Festival. He was Chief Operating Officer of the inaugural 2015 European Games in Baku and also managed the British Biathlon Team and Team GB athletes at twelve Summer and Winter Olympic Games. In addition he orchestrated the national political and PR campaigns to persuade the Government and Mayor of London to bid for the 2012 Olympic Games.

== Early life ==
Simon Clegg was born in Harlington, Middlesex and grew up in Godalming, Surrey and attended Stowe School in Buckingham. He spent two years as a trainee Quantity surveyor in Guildford and joined the Parachute Regiment as a territorial soldier. After two years and a short period as a regular soldier in the Parachute Regiment, he passed the selection process for entry into the Royal Military Academy, Sandhurst.

He was commissioned in 1981 into the Royal Regiment of Artillery and posted to the 94th Locating Regiment in Celle, West Germany. After three seasons as a competitive cross country skier and biathlete, he was in seconded for 12 months to the British Ski Federation. On his return to the Army he was selected to join the Royal Horse Artillery and in 1988 at the age of 28 completed the final year of his Short Service Commission by commanding a Battery in 7th Parachute Regiment Royal Horse Artillery.

== British Biathlon Team ==
On secondment from the Army, Clegg managed the British Biathlon Team for the 1984/85 season and was involved in World Cup races in Belarus and East Germany and a world championship event in Ruhpolding (West Germany). On returning to the Army in 1985, he was appointed part-time Manager of the National Development squad. Clegg was nominated by the British Ski Federation to be the British Olympic Association's Team Quartermaster for the 1988 Olympic Winter Games in Calgary, Subsequently was asked to manage the sole British ski jumper Eddie 'The Eagle' Edwards. He undertook a similar role as Team GB's Quartermaster at the 1988 Olympic Games in Seoul.

== British Olympic Association ==
On leaving the Army in 1989, Clegg joined the British Olympic Association as Assistant General Secretary becoming Deputy General Secretary two years later and in 1997 became the organisation's first Chief Executive.

In 1990, he was seconded to help manage the IOC Session in Birmingham and in 1995 was Chief Executive of the European Youth Olympic Festival in Bath, the largest international multi-sport youth event ever staged in the UK, involving 48 countries, 10 sports and 2600 athletes.

In total, Clegg managed Team GB athletes at twelve Olympic and Olympic Winter Games, six as Team GB's Chef de Mission including Salt Lake City (Team GB's most successful Olympic Winter Games since 1936) and Beijing (Team GB's most successful Olympic Games since London in 1908). In Beijing he achieved the aspirational target that he'd set for Team GB in London of fourth place in the medals table (for which he had been ridiculed in certain parts of the British media) four years early.

During the 2004 Olympic Games in Athens, Clegg controversially decided to take the International Equestrian Federation to the Court of Arbitration for Sport over a judging decision in the three-day event. The court found in favour of the British Team, who were supported in the action by France and the US, resulting in Leslie Law winning the gold medal, Pippa Funnell winning the bronze medal and the entire team being upgraded from bronze to silver medalists. These medals were presented by Her Royal Highness The Princess Royal in the presence of Her Majesty The Queen at the Team GB reception at Buckingham Palace after the Games.

== 2012 Olympic Games ==
Clegg was part of Manchester's failed bids for the 1996 and 2000 Olympic Games. In 1997 on his appointment as the British Olympic Association's Chief Executive, he together with his Chairman, Craig Reedie and Project Manager, David Luckes, set about exploring whether London could host an Olympic Games. Clegg orchestrated the political and PR campaigns which culminated in the announcement in the House of Commons by the Prime Minister that London would bid for 2012. Clegg handed the project over to the bid committee headed up initially by Barbara Cassani and then subsequently Seb Coe. He was a board member of the bid, one of three British signatories on the host city contract in Singapore and subsequently a board member of LOCOG until he resigned on leaving the British Olympic Association after the Beijing Olympic Games. Clegg was however invited by Lord Coe, the LOCOG Chairman, to retain his position on the LOCOG Sports Advisory Group where he remained until the closing ceremony.

During the 2012 Olympic Games, Clegg was appointed as the official Olympic Attache for Guam.

== Ipswich Town ==
Clegg was appointed Chief Executive of Ipswich Town in April 2009 replacing Derek Bowden and working directly with the club's owner Marcus Evans. One of his first tasks was to replace the manager, Jim Magilton with former Sunderland FC manager Roy Keane on a two-year contract that was terminated on 7 January 2011. Paul Jewell replaced Keane until he resigned in October 2012 whereupon the former Wolves FC manager, Mick McCarthy was appointed with whom Clegg worked until he himself resigned in February 2013.

It is reported that Clegg obstinately supported Liverpool FC in his childhood because his father was a Manchester United shareholder. From 2007- 2009 Clegg was a member of the Chelsea FC Advisory Board.

== 2015 European Games ==
In 2013, Clegg was appointed as the European Olympic Committee's Senior Consultant (subsequently Executive Director) for the European Games in Baku. In 2014, he replaced Jim Scherr as the Organising Committee's Chief Operating Officer and relocated to Azerbaijan. He led a team of 2,500 full-time staff, supported by 12,000 volunteers, to deliver an event with a global television audience of 823 million households in an unprecedented compressed timescale.

== Honours/Awards ==
He was made an Officer of the Order of the British Empire in 2001 for his management of Team GB at the 2000 Olympic Games (Team GB's most successful Olympic Games since 1920) and a Commander of the Order of the British Empire in 2005 for his contribution to the London Olympic bid.

The President of the Republic of Azerbaijan awarded Clegg the Dostlug Order in July 2015 for his contribution to the success of the inaugural European Games.

In 2008, he was awarded the British Sports Journalists' JL Manning award for outstanding services off the field of play and in 2012 an Honorary Degree from University Campus Suffolk.

In 2000, he was part of the BBC's Sports Personality Team of the Year award.
