= Hugh Tootell =

English Catholic historian

Hugh Tootell (1671/72 – 27 February 1743) was an English Catholic historian. He is commonly known under his pseudonym Charles Dodd.

== Life ==
Tootell was born in Lancashire. He was tutored by his uncle, Christopher Tootle, before studying with Edward Hawarden at the English College, Douay (1688–1693). He earned a bachelor of divinity at St Gregory's Seminary, Paris (1693–1697). He adopted the pen name "Charles Dodd" to spare his family a fine under the Penal Laws, for sending him abroad to be educated. He travelled widely in Europe, and after ordination he returned to England in 1698 to serve for a time on the English mission, before becoming chaplain to the Molyneux family at Mosborough Hall, Lancashire.

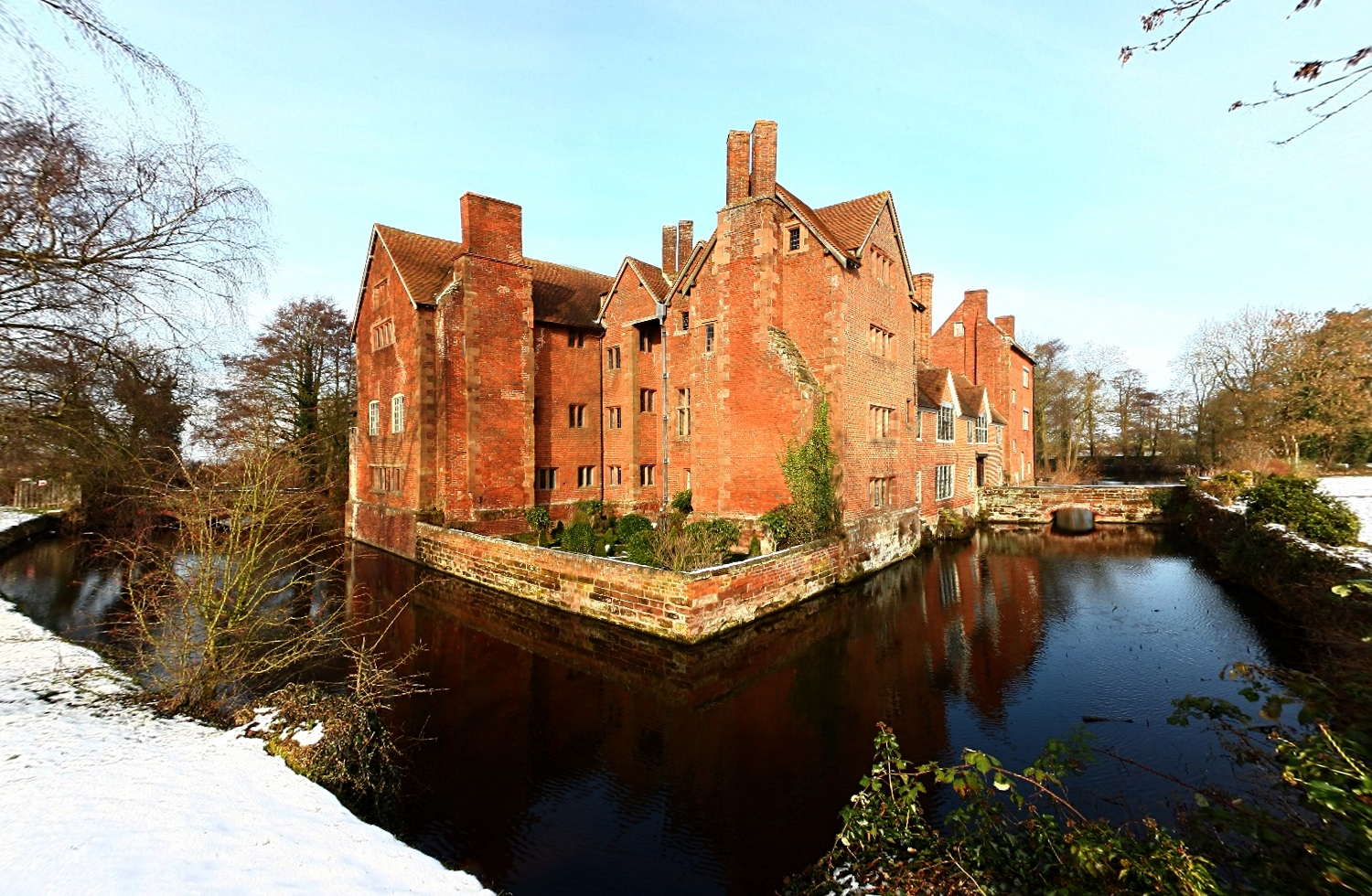
Harvington Hall

In 1711 he returned to the Continent where he is said to have witnessed the siege of Douay (1712) as chaplain to an English regiment; certainly he wrote in that character a short History of the English College at Douay (1713) which purported to be by a Protestant chaplain. As it attacked the Jesuits, Father Thomas Hunter published his "Modest Defence" (1714), to which Dodd replied in The Secret Policy of the English Society of Jesus (1715). From 1716 he was again at Mosborough till 1718, when he returned to Douay to collect materials for his magnum opus The Church History of England from 1500 to 1688, which occupied him for twenty years. The work was written at Harvington Hall, Worcestershire, where he resided from 1722 till his death, first as assistant chaplain, then (from 1726) as chaplain to Robert Throckmorton.

During his sojourn abroad he wrote and published Pax Vobis: An Epistle to the Three Churches (London, 1721); and while at Harvington he composed several spiritual, controversial, and historical treatises most of which have never been published. Many of these MSS. are preserved at St Mary's College, Oscott. Those certainly published were: Certamen Utriusque Ecclesiae (1724); An Abridgment of Christian Doctrine (s.d.) and Flores Cleri Anglo-Catholici (s.d.)

After many years' labour the Church History was completed in three folio volumes published in 1737, 1739, and 1742 at Wolverhampton, though for prudential reasons Brussels appears on the title-page. Father John Constable, S.J., attacked the work as unfair to the Jesuits, and Dodd replied in An Apology for the Church History of English, published in 1742. On his death-bed Dodd expressed his desire to die in peace with the Jesuits.

The Church History presented an important alternative view of history, and its primary source documents in the appendices provided a valuable resource for later historians. John Lingard was a subscriber for one of the later editions.
