= Swinnerton =

Swinnerton may refer to:

== People ==
=== Individuals ===
- Alastair Swinnerton, British writer and producer
- Bernadette Swinnerton, English racing cyclist
- Cath Swinnerton, English racing cyclist
- Charles Octavius Swinnerton Morgan, English politician, historian and antiquary
- Frank Arthur Swinnerton, English novelist, critic, biographer and essayist
- George Swinnerton Parker, American board game inventor and industrialist
- Henry Hurd Swinnerton, British geologist
- Jane Swinnerton, British field hockey player
- Jimmy Swinnerton, American desert landscape painter and cartoonist
- Mark Swinnerton, English musician, former member of Mansun
- Matthew Swinnerton, English musician, former member of the Rakes
- Peter Swinnerton-Dyer, English mathematician

=== Groups ===
- Milborne-Swinnerton-Pilkington Baronets, title in the Baronetage of Nova Scotia

== Things ==
- Birch and Swinnerton-Dyer conjecture relates the rank of the abelian group of points over a number field of an elliptic curve E to the order of the zero of the associated L-function L (E, s) at s = 1

== See also ==
- Swynnerton (surname)
