= 1945 New Year Honours =

British royal recognitions

The 1945 New Year Honours were appointments by many of the Commonwealth realms of King George VI to various orders and honours to reward and highlight good works by citizens of those countries. They were announced on 1 January 1945 for the British Empire, Canada, and the Union of South Africa to celebrate the past year and mark the beginning of 1945.

The recipients of honours are displayed here as they were styled before their new honour, and arranged by honour, with classes (Knight, Knight Grand Cross, etc.) and then divisions (Military, Civil, etc.) as appropriate.

== British Empire ==
=== Earl ===
- The Right Honourable David Lloyd George, OM MP

=== Viscount ===
- The Right Honourable Wyndham Raymond, Baron Portal, DSO MVO – Minister of Works, 1942–1944.

=== Baron ===
- Sir Arthur Grey Hazlerigg, Bt – His Majesty's Lieutenant of the County of Leicester. For public services.

=== Baronet ===
- Major Thomas Lionel Dugdale, JP DL MP – Member of Parliament for the Richmond division of Yorkshire since May 1929. Chairman of the Conservative Party Organization, March 1942 to October 1944. For political and public services.
- Sir Charles Bruce-Gardner – lately Controller of Labour Allocation and Supply, Ministry of Aircraft Production. Chief Executive for Reconversion, Board of Trade.
- Sir Alfred Edward Webb-Johnson, KCVO CBE DSO TD MB ChB – President of the Royal College of Surgeons.

=== Privy Counsellors ===
- Miss Florence Horsbrugh, CBE MP, Member of Parliament for Dundee since 1931. Parliamentary Secretary, Ministry of Health, since 1939.
- Miss Ellen Cicely Wilkinson, MP, Member of Parliament for Middlesbrough East 1929–1931, and for Jarrow since 1935. Parliamentary Secretary, Ministry of Home Security, since 1940.

=== Knight Bachelor ===
- Leslie Patrick Abercrombie, MA FRIBA – Professor of Town Planning in the University of London.
- Edward Battersby Bailey, MC DSc FRS – Director of the Geological Survey of Great Britain, Department of Scientific and Industrial Research.
- Frederick William Bain, MC – chairman, Chemical Control Board, Ministry of Supply.
- Captain Ernest Arthur Bridges – lately Commodore Master, Royal Mail Line Fleet, Royal Mail Lines Ltd.
- Peter Boswell Brown, MInstCE MInstMM JP – chairman and managing director, Hadfields Ltd.
- James Chadwick, MSc PhD DSc FRS – Professor of Physics in the University of Liverpool. For services to the Department of Scientific and Industrial Research.
- Lawrence Andrew Common, DSO – Director, Ship Management Division, Ministry of War Transport.
- Philip d'Ambrumenil – deputy chairman, War Risks Insurance Office.
- Charles Frederick Deslandes – Chief Inspector, Board of Customs and Excise.
- Roy Hardy Dobson, CBE – Managing Director, A.V. Roe and Company Ltd.
- Commander Aylmer Newton George Firebrace, CBE RN (Retired) – Chief of the Fire Staff and Inspector-in-Chief of the Fire Services, Home Office.
- Arthur Percy Morris Fleming, CBE DEng MSc MIEE MIMechE – Director, Metropolitan Vickers Electrical Company, Manchester. For services to education.
- Claude Howard Stanley Frankau, CBE DSO MS MB FRCS LRCP – Director, Emergency Medical Services, London and Home Counties.
- Edward Hardy – Chairman of Kent County Council.
- Lieutenant-Colonel Arthur Pelham Heneage, DSO JP DL MP – Member of Parliament for Louth since 1924. For political and public services.
- Roger Gaskell Hetherington, CB OBE MInstCE – Adviser on Water and Director of Water Surveys, Ministry of Health.
- William Percival Hildred, CB OBE – Director-General of Civil Aviation, Air Ministry.
- Mark Hodgson, OBE JP – General Secretary, United Society of Boilermakers and Iron and Steel Shipbuilders.
- Joseph Stanley Holmes – MP Member of Parliament for North-East Derbyshire, 1918–1922, and for Harwich since November 1935. For political and public services.
- Alfred Bakewell Howitt, CVO MD MP – Member of Parliament for Reading since October 1931. For political and public services.
- Robert Dixon Kingham, CBE – Secretary, National Savings Committee.
- Robert Fisher Lancaster, Secretary and Executive Officer of the Co-operative Wholesale Society Ltd.
- Allan Campbell Macdiarmid – chairman and managing director, Stewarts & Lloyds, Ltd.
- Geoffrey Le Mesurier Mander, JP MP – Member of Parliament for Wolverhampton East since May 1929. For political and public services.
- Ellis Hovell Minns, LittD FBA – Emeritus Professor of Archaeology and President of Pembroke College, University of Cambridge.
- Arthur Evan Morgan – General Manager and Director, The London Assurance.
- John Morison – Director General of Finance, Ministry of Supply.
- James Frederick Rees, MA – Principal of University College of South Wales and Monmouthshire, Cardiff. Vice-chancellor of the University of Wales.
- Lieutenant-Colonel Norman Gibb Scorgie, CVO CBE – Controller, H.M. Stationery Office.
- Arthur Frederick Sidgreaves, OBE – Managing Director, Rolls-Royce Ltd.
- Frederick James Simmons, JP – Mayor of Londonderry.
- Alderman Bracewell Smith, MP – Sheriff of the City of London.
- David Wadsworth Smith, FCIS JP – Director, Halifax Building Society.
- William Samuel Stephenson, MC DFC – employed in a Department of the Foreign Office.
- Reginald Edward Stradling, CB MC DSc PhD MInstCE FRS – Chief Adviser, Research and Experiments Department; Ministry of Home Security.
- Herbert Alker Tripp, CBE – Assistant Commissioner, Metropolitan Police.
- Lieutenant-Colonel Gilbert John Acland Troyte, CMG DSO JP MP – Member of Parliament for Tiverton since 1924. For political and public services.
- Alderman William Walker, MIEE MIMechE JP – For services to Municipal Electricity Supply.
- Angus Watson, JP – Divisional Food Officer, Northern Division, Ministry of Food.
- Lionel Ernest Howard Whitby, CVO MC MD BCh FRCP MRCS DPH – (Brigadier, Territorial Army, Reserve of Officers), lately Bacteriologist at the Middlesex Hospital. For services in the development of the sulphonamide group of drugs.
- Professor Edmund Taylor Whittaker, LLD ScD FRS – Professor of Mathematics, University of Edinburgh. Lately President of the Royal Society of Edinburgh.

Dominions

- Digby Vere Burnett – Resident Director and General Manager of the London and Rhodesia Mining and Land Company, Limited, and Chairman of the Cold Storage Commission, Southern Rhodesia.
- Colonel Arthur Murray Cudmore, CMG MB BS FRCS – President of the Medical Board of the State of South Australia. For public services.
- Thomas Sydney Nettlefold, OBE – Lord Mayor of the City of Melbourne, State of Victoria.

India

- The Honourable Mr. Justice Harsidhbhai Vajubhai Divatia – Puisne Judge of the High Court of Judicature at Bombay.
- The Honourable Mr. Justice James Joseph Whittlesea Allsop – Indian Civil Service, Puisne Judge of the High Court of Judicature at Allahabad, United Provinces.
- The Honourable Mr. Justice Syed Najim Ali – Puisne Judge of the High Court of Judicature at Fort William in Bengal.
- Robert William Target, CIE – Director-General, Supply and Disposals, Department of Supply, Government of India.
- Eric Thomas Coates, CSI CIE – Indian Civil Service, Financial Adviser, Military Finance, Government of India.
- Bomanji Jamshedji Wadia – Barrister-at-Law, Vice-chancellor, University of Bombay.
- Diwan Bahadur Arcot Lakshmanaswami Mudaliyar, LLD DSc MD – Vice-chancellor, University of Madras.
- Charles William Blyth Normand, CIE DSc – Officer on Special Duty, India Meteorological Department, and lately Director-General of Observatories, Government of India.
- Claude Cavendish Inglis, CIE BAI MInstCE – Indian Service of Engineers (retired), Director, Indian Waterways Experiment Station, Poona.
- Khan Bahadur Malik Muhammad Amin Khan, CBE – Landlord, Shamsabad, Attock District, Punjab.
- James McHame Doak – Managing Director and Partner, Messrs. A. & F. Harvey, Madura, Madras.
- Jehangir Jivaji Ghandy, CIE – Agent, Tata Iron & Steel Company, Limited.
- Shrinivas Prasonna Rajagopalachari – Home Minister and vice-president of the Executive Council of Gwalior State.

Colonies, Protectorates, etc.

- Henry William Butler Blackall – Colonial Legal Service, Chief Justice, Trinidad.
- Lieutenant-Colonel Stewart Gore-Browne, DSO – For public services in Northern Rhodesia.
- Walter Harrangin – Colonial Legal Service, Chief Justice of the Gold Coast.
- Colonel Percy John Parsons, CBE ED – For public services in Ceylon.

=== Knight of the Most Ancient and Most Noble Order of the Thistle (KT) ===
- Admiral of the Fleet Sir Andrew Browne Cunningham, Bt GCB DSO – First Sea Lord and Chief of the Naval Staff.

=== The Most Honourable Order of the Bath ===
==== Knight Grand Cross of the Order of the Bath (GCB) ====
Military Division

- General Sir Frederick Alfred Pile, Bt KCB DSO MC – (3052), late Royal Tank Corps.
- General Sir Claude John Eyre Auchinleck, GCIE CB CSI DSO OBE – (115611), Indian Army, Aide-de-Camp General to The King.

Civil Division

- Sir Alexander Maxwell, KCB KBE, Permanent Under Secretary of State, Home Office.

==== Knights Commander of the Order of the Bath (KCB) ====
Military Division

- Vice-Admiral Irvine Gordon Glennie, CB
- Vice-Admiral Arthur Francis Eric Palliser, CB DSC
- Vice-Admiral Frederick Hew George Dalrymple-Hamilton, CB
- Rear-Admiral Cloudesley Varyl Robinson, CB (Retired).
- Lieutenant-General Sir Henry Royds Pownall, KBE CB DSO MC – (3553), Colonel Commandant, Royal Artillery.
- General Henry Finnis, CB MC – Colonel 312th Frontier Force Regiment, Indian Army.
- Air Marshal Sir Keith Rodney Park, KBE CB MC DFC Royal Air Force.
- Air Marshal Sir Harold Edward Whittingham, KBE Royal Air Force.
- Air Vice-Marshal George Laing, CB CBE Royal Air Force.

Civil Division

- Frederick Arthur Whitaker, CB
- Colonel John Bickerton McKaig, CB DSO TD DL – chairman, Territorial Army and Air Force Association of the County of Lancaster (West).
- Major Desmond John Falkiner Morton, CB CMG MC, Personal Assistant to the Prime Minister.
- The Honourable Albert Edward Alexander Napier, CB, Permanent Secretary to the Lord Chancellor and Clerk of the Crown.

==== Companion of the Order of the Bath (CB) ====
Military Division

- Rear-Admiral Cedric Swinton Holland.
- Rear-Admiral Charles Eric Morgan, DSO
- Rear-Admiral Victor Alexander Charles Crutchley, VC DSC.
- Rear-Admiral Oliver Bevir
- Rear-Admiral Douglas Blake Fisher, CBE.
- Rear-Admiral Arthur William La Touche Bisset, CBE.
- Rear-Admiral James Stuart Maclaren Ritchie (Retired).
- Rear-Admiral Reginald Burnard Darke, DSO (Retired).
- Rear-Admiral Charles Frederick Harris (Retired).
- Engineer Rear-Admiral Albert Kingsley Dibley.
- Major-General Hamilton Wilkie Simpson, DSO – Royal Marines.
- Temporary Lieutenant (Acting Temporary Captain (Special Branch)) the Right Honourable John Charles Walsham, Baron Reith, GCVO GBE RNVR
- Colonel (temporary Major-General) Alexander Vass Anderson, MBE – (17247), late Royal Engineers.
- Colonel (temporary Major-General) Gerald Brunskill, MC – (18511), late The Royal Ulster Rifles.
- Colonel (temporary Major-General) Alexander Maurice Cameron, MC – (9292), late Royal Engineers.
- Major-General John Scott Crawford, – (11221), late Royal Army Ordnance Corps.
- Lieutenant-Colonel (temporary Colonel) John Henry Bevan, MC – (50751). Reserve of Officers, General List, Territorial Army.
- Colonel (temporary Major-General) David Robertson Duguid, MBE AMIEE AMIMechE – (34486), late -Royal Electrical and Mechanical Engineers.
- Colonel (temporary Brigadier) Charles Esmond de Wolff, CBE – (15057), late Royal Army Ordnance Corps.
- Colonel (temporary Major-General) Donald Rutherford Dacre Fisher, CBE DSO – (927), late Royal Artillery.
- Colonel (honorary Major-General) Ian Cameron Grant, CBE DSO – (19374), late The Queen's Own Cameron Highlanders.
- Colonel (temporary Major-General) Reginald Kingscote Hewer, CBE MC – (9276), late Royal Armoured Corps.
- Colonel (temporary Major-General) John Charles Francis Holland, DFC – (18665), late Royal Engineers.
- Colonel (temporary Major-General) Harold Reginald Kerr, OBE MC – (17076), late Royal Army Service Corps.
- Colonel (temporary Major-General) Robert Edward Laycock, DSO – (37258), Royal Horse Guards.
- Major-General Herbert Lumsden, DSO MC – (11523), late Royal Armoured Corps.
- Colonel (temporary Major-General) William Godwin Michelmore, DSO MC TD – (25379), Royal Corps of Signals, Territorial Army, Aide-de-Camp to The King.
- Colonel (temporary Brigadier) Arthur Penrice Sayer, DSO – (4740), retired pay, Reserve of Officers, late Royal Engineers.
- Colonel (temporary Brigadier) William Ross Stewart, CIE MB ChB (Edinburgh), FRCS (Edinburgh), KHP VHS – Indian Medical Service.
- Major-General David Turnbull Richardson, MC MB KHS – (3014), Royal Army Medical Corps.
- Colonel (honorary Major-General) Guy St. George Robinson, DSO MC – (1909), retired pay, Colonel, The Northamptonshire Regiment.
- Colonel (temporary Major-General) Gilbert France Watson, DSO OBE – (16422), late The Royal Welch Fusiliers.
- Lieutenant-Colonel (temporary Colonel) Alexander Craven Vicary, DSO MC – (4144), Reserve of Officers, The Gloucestershire Regiment.
- Colonel (honorary Major-General) John Edward Talbot Younger (15078), retired pay, late Royal Artillery.
- Major-General Cyril Maton Periam Durnford, CIE – Indian Army.
- Major-General Robert Harley Wordsworth, CBE – Indian Army.
- Colonel (temporary Major-General) Ernest Wood, CIE MC – Indian Army.
- Colonel (temporary Major-General) Francis Robert Roy Bucher, OBE MC – Indian Army.
- Captain (Commodore Second Class) Sir Atwell Henry Lake, Bt OBE – Royal Navy (Retired).
- Colonel Frescheville Hubert Ballantine-Dykes, DSO OBE ADC – President, Territorial Army Association of the County of Cumberland.
- Brevet Colonel Charles Joseph Edmondstoune-Cranstoun, DSO TD, DL – chairman, Territorial Army Association of the County of Lanark.
- Lieutenant-Colonel (Honorary Colonel) Ernest Clive Atkins, DL – chairman, Territorial Army Association of the County of Leicester.
- Air Vice-Marshal Leslie Oswald Brown, CBE DSC AFC, Royal Air Force.
- Air Vice-Marshal Thomas Walker Elmhirst, CBE AFC Royal Air Force.
- Air Vice-Marshal Andrew Grant, CBE MB ChB DPH KHS, Royal Air Force.
- Air Vice-Marshal Thomas Audley Langford-Sainsbury, OBE DFC AFC, Royal Air Force.
- Acting Air Vice-Marshal Edward Barker Addison, CBE, Royal Air Force.
- Acting Air Vice-Marshal Edward Derek Davis, OBE, Royal Air Force.
- Acting Air Vice-Marshal Basil Edward Embry, DSO AFC, Royal Air Force.
- Acting Air Vice-Marshal Frank Linden Hopps, CBE AFC, Royal Air Force.
- Acting Air Vice-Marshal Edmund Cuthbert Hudleston, CBE, Royal Air Force.
- Acting Air Vice-Marshal Clarence Edward William Lockyer, Royal Air Force
- Acting Air Vice-Marshal Clifford MacKayMcEwen, MC DFC, Royal Canadian Air Force.
- Acting Air Vice-Marshal Frank Hubert McNamara, VC CBE, Royal Australian Air Force.
- Acting Air Vice-Marshal Stanley Flamank Vincent, DFC AFC, Royal Air Force.
- Acting Air Vice-Marshal John Whitford, CBE, Royal Air Force.
- Air Commodore Charles Edward Hamilton Allen, DFC, Royal Air Force.
- Air Commodore George Harold Boyce, AFC, Royal Air Force.
- Air Commodore Paul Richard Tankerville James Michael Isidore Camille Chamberlayne, AFC, Royal Air Force.
- Air Commodore Leonard Herbert Cockey, Royal Air Force.
- Air Commodore Percy Eric Maitland, MVO AFC, Royal Air Force.
- Acting Air Commodore Sydney Osborne Button, DFC, Royal Air Force.
- Acting Air Commodore Philip Lionel Lincoln, DSO MC, Auxiliary Air Force.
- Acting Air Commodore Ivor Thomas Lloyd, CBE, Royal Air Force.
- Air Vice-Marshal Thomas Ernest Victor Hurley, CMG VD, Royal Australian Air Force.

Civil Division

- George Arthur Bassett
- William Castle Cleary, Esq., Principal Assistant Secretary, Ministry of Education.
- Guildhaume Myrddin-Evans, Esq., Under-Secretary, Ministry of Labour and National Service.
- Lewis Noel Vincent Evans, Esq., First Assistant Director of Public Prosecutions.
- Edward Abdy Fellowes, Esq., M.C., Second Clerk Assistant, House of Commons.
- Alfred Sutherland Le Maitre, Esq., M.C., Principal Assistant Secretary, Admiralty.
- Warner Herbert Taylor Ottley, Esq., Director of Finance, War Office.
- John Williams Parker, Esq., Second Secretary, Scottish Education Department.
- Edward Llewellyn Pickles, Esq., O.B.E., Director of Contracts, Ministry of Aircraft Production.
- Gleeson Edward Robinson, Esq., M.C., LL.D., Regional Transport Commissioner for London, Ministry of War Transport.
- Dudley Buhner Toye, Esq., O.B.E., LL.D., Principal Assistant Secretary, Ministry of Agriculture and Fisheries.

=== Order of Merit ===
- Professor Alfred North Whitehead,

=== Order of the Star of India ===
==== Knight Grand Commander of the Order of the Star of India (GCSI) ====
- His Highness Maharaja Sri Jaya Chamaraja Wadiyar Bahadur, Maharaja of Mysore.

==== Knight Commander of the Order of the Star of India (GCSI) ====
- The Honourable Sir Sultan Ahmed, Barrister-at-Law, Member of the Governor-General's Executive Council.

==== Companions of the Order of the Star of India (CSI) ====
- Ewan Moore Gawne, Esq., CIE, Indian Civil Service, Member, Board of Revenue, Madras.
- Major-General John Simon Stuart Martin, MB ChB MRCP KHS, Indian Medical Service, seconded Indian Army Medical Corps, Deputy Director of Medical Services, Central Command, India.
- Thomas Cooke Samuel Jayaratnani, Esq., CIE, Indian Civil Service, Chief Secretary to the Government of the Central Provinces and Berar.
- William Christie, Esq., CIE MC, Indian Civil Service, Chief Secretary to the Government of the United Provinces.
- Wilfred Vernon Grigson, Esq., Indian Civil Service, Revenue and Police Member, His Exalted Highness the Nizam's Executive Council, Hyderabad, Deccan.

=== Order of St Michael and St George ===
==== Knights Grand Cross (GCMG) ====
- Captain the Honourable Sir Bede Edmund Hugh Clifford, KCMG CB MVO, Governor and Commander-in-Chief, Trinidad.

==== Knights Commander (KCMG) ====
- Henry Charles Ponsonby, Earl of Drogheda, CMG, Director-General., Ministry of Economic Warfare.
- Sir Walter Turner Monckton, KCVO MC KC, lately Director-General of British Propaganda and Information Services at Cairo.
- Brigadier Sir David Petrie, CIE CVO CBE, attached General Staff, War Office.
- Raibeart Maclntyre MacDougall, Esq.,CIE, Counsellor to the Governor of Burma.
- Charles William Dixon, Esq., CMG OBE, an Assistant Under-Secretary of State in the Dominions Office.
- The Honourable Sir John Mellis Napier, Lieutenant-Governor and Chief Justice of the State of South Australia.
- Gerard Leslie Makins Clauson, Esq., CMG OBE, Assistant Under-Secretary of State, Colonial Office.
- Leslie Brian Freeston, Esq., CMG OBE, Governor and Commander-in-Chief, Leeward Islands.
- Admiral Sir Geoffrey Layton, KCB DSO RN, Commander-in-Chief, Ceylon.
- John Stuart Macpherson, Esq., CMG, Colonial Administrative Service, British Resident Member in Washington of the Anglo-American Caribbean Commission, and Head of the British Colonies Supply Mission.
- Victor Courtenay Walter Forbes, Esq., CMG, His Majesty's Ambassador Extraordinary and Plenipotentiary at Lima.

==== Companions (CMG) ====
- George Archer, Esq., Under-secretary, Ministry of Production.
- Eric Alfred Berthoud, Esq., Temporary Assistant Secretary, Ministry of Fuel and Power.
- Robert James Cruikshank, Esq., Director, American Division, Ministry of Information.
- William Lionel Fraser, Esq., Temporary Principal Assistant Secretary, His Majesty's Treasury.
- The Honourable Geoffrey Cokayne Gibbs, Assistant Secretary, Ministry of Economic Warfare.
- Edward Mayow Hastings Lloyd, Esq., lately Economic and Financial Adviser to the Minister Resident in the Middle East.
- Lieutenant-Colonel Henry Nathan Sporborg, Civil Assistant, War Office.
- Wilfrid Hugh Payton, Esq., Indian Civil Service, Burma.
- Allan Robert Callaghan, Esq., DPhil, Principal of Roseworthy Agricultural College, State of South Australia. For public services.
- Richard Romney Sedgwick, Esq., an Assistant Secretary in the Dominions Office.
- Lieutenant-Colonel John Pringle Appleby, Postmaster General, Ceylon.
- Denzil Layton Blunt, Esq., Colonial Agricultural Service, Director of Agriculture, Kenya
- Frank Leslie Brown, Esq., OBE MC, Colonial Administrative Service, Deputy Colonial Secretary, Jamaica.
- Sydney Caine, Esq., Assistant Under-Secretary of State, Colonial Office.
- Henry Spelderwinde de Boer, Esq., MC MRCS LRCP DPH DTM&H, Colonial Medical Service, Director of Medical Services, Uganda.
- Alan Frederick Edmond Fieldgate, Esq., Colonial Administrative Service, Provincial Commissioner, Gold Coast.
- Charles Geoffry Shield Follows, Esq., Colonial Administrative Service, Administrative Secretary, Northern Rhodesia.
- Percy Graham Harris, Esq., Colonial Administrative Service, Senior Resident, Nigeria.
- George Andrew Joy, Esq., Colonial Administrative Service, Civil Secretary, Aden.
- Malcolm Buchanan Laing, Esq., OBE, Commissioner for Local Government, British Guiana.
- George Charlewood Turner, Esq., MC, Colonial Education Service, Principal of Makerere College, Uganda.
- John Leonard Worlledge, Esq., Colonial Audit Service, Director, Colonial Audit Department.
- Geoffrey Cuthbert Allchin, Esq., MC, Head of the Consular Department of the Foreign Office.
- Francis Lyall Birch, Esq., OBE, Attached to a Department of the Foreign Office.
- Henry Lambton Carr, Esq. For services to the Foreign Office.
- Pierson John Dixon, Esq., Private Secretary to His Majesty's Principal Secretary of State for Foreign Affairs.
- Lieutenant-Colonel William Ellis, RAMC (retired), Press Attache at His Majesty's Consulate-General, Tangier.
- Harold Lister Farquhar, Esq., MC, His Majesty's Consul-General at Barcelona.
- Brigadier Richard Gambier-Parry, Attached to a Department of the Foreign Office.
- Philip Ingleson, Esq., MBE MC, Provincial Governor, Sudan Political Service.
- William Lowry Craig Knight, Esq., His Majesty's Consul-General at Basra.
- William Ivo Mallet, Esq., Head of the Personnel Department of the Foreign Office.
- Frederick Vanden Heuvel, Esq., attached to a Department of the Foreign Office.
- William Guy Weston, Esq., Principal Assistant Secretary, Ministry of War Transport.

=== Order of the Indian Empire ===
==== Knights Commander (KCIE) ====
- Captain His Highness Maharaja Jagaddipendra Narayan Bhup Bahadur, Maharaja of Cooch-Behar.
- Sir Leonard Wilson, lately Chief Commissioner of Railways.
- Major-General (Temporary Lieut.-General) Henry Beresford Dennitts Willcox, CB DSO MC, Chairman, Army Re-organisation Committee, India, and lately General Officer Commanding-in-Chief, Central Command, India.
- Raja Padam Singh, CSI, Raja of Bashahr.
- Thomas Austin, Esq., CIE, Indian Civil Service, Adviser to His Excellency the Governor of Madras.

==== Companions (CIE) ====
- Major-General William Calder Paton, MC, Indian Medical Service, Surgeon-General with the Government of Bengal.
- Daintry Douglas Warren, Esq., MC, Indian Civil Service, Joint Secretary to the Government of India in the Department of War Transport.
- Colonel (Temporary Major-General) Frederick John Alfieri, Indian Army, Deputy Quartermaster-General, General Headquarters, India.
- Lieutenant-Colonel (Acting Major-General) Frank Hollamby Skinner, OBE, 19 Hyderabad Regiment, Major-General i/c. Administration, Headquarters, Eastern Command, India.
- George Augustus Roderick Trimming, Esq., Deputy Director-General, Machine Tool Control Directorate-General of Munitions Production, Department of Supply, Government of India.
- Khurshed Ahmad Khan, Esq., Indian Civil Service, lately Chief Commissioner, Ajmer Merwara.
- Alexander MacFarquhar, Esq., Indian Civil Service, Deputy Director-General, Directorate-General of Supply, Department of Supply, Government of India.
- Leonard George Coke Wallis, Esq., Indian Political Service, Resident for the Eastern States.
- Joseph Herbert Thompson, Esq., Indian Political Service, Resident for Kolhapur and the Deccan States.
- Colonel (Temporary Brigadier) Aubertin Walter Sothers Mallaby, OBE, Indian Army, Commander, 49th Indian Infantry Brigade, and late Director of Military Operations, General Headquarters, India.
- Richard Aelwyn Ellis Williams, Esq., Indian Civil Service, Chief Secretary to the Government of Orissa and lately Commerce and Revenue Secretary to the Government of Bihar.
- Sri Rao Sahib Pathiyil Appu Nair, OBE, Barrister-at-Law, Secretary to the Government of Madras, Legal Department, and Remembrancer of Legal Affairs, Madras.
- Douglas Shield Barren, Esq., Indian Civil Service, Secretary to the Government of the United Provinces in the Home Department.
- Ainsley Marshall Rendall Montagu, Esq., Indian Service of Engineers, Chief Engineer and Secretary to the Government of the Punjab, Public Works Department, Irrigation Branch.
- Colonel (Local Brigadier) Lancelot Cecil Torbock Graham, MC ADC, Indian Army, Colonel "A", General Headquarters, Persia and Iraq Force.
- Erode Ramaswamy Iyer Seshu Ayyar, Esq., Indian Audit and Accounts Service, Director of Railway Audit, Government of India.
- Percy Raymond Leigh-Bennett, Esq., Transportation Manager, Bengal Nagpur Railway, Kidderpore (Calcutta).
- Colonel (Temporary Brigadier) Charles Joseph Weld, MC, Indian Army, Commander, Rawalpindi Area.
- Captain Stanley Johnstone Thomson, Royal Indian Navy, Director of Personal Services, Naval Headquarters, India.
- Norman Frederick Frome, Esq., DFC MIEE, Additional Chief Engineer, Construction, Posts and Telegraphs, New Delhi.
- Alexander Webster, Esq., MInstCE, Chief Engineer, Calcutta Port Commissioners.
- Bernard St. John Newton, Esq., Indian Service of Engineers, Chief Engineer to Government, Public Works Department, Central Provinces and Berar.
- Daulat Ram Sethi, Esq., Indian Agricultural Service, Agricultural Production Adviser and Agricultural Marketing Adviser, Government of India.
- John Chambers, Esq., OBE MC, Chief Engineer, Bengal.
- Hugh Shaw George, Esq., Indian Forest Service, Chief Conservator of Forests, Central Provinces and Berar.
- John Birtwistle Tyrrell Brooks, Esq., Indian Forest Service, Chief Conservator of Forests, Bombay.
- Narayan Prasad Asthana, Esq., Advocate General, United Provinces.
- Khan Bahadur Shariff Ahmed Ali Sahib Bahadur, Collector and District Magistrate, Madras.
- Major Iskandar Mirza, OBE, Indian Political Service, Deputy Commissioner, Peshawar, North-West Frontier Province.
- Lieutenant-Colonel Geoffrey Baynton Williams, MC, Indian Political Service, Political Agent, Western Rajputana States, Jodhpur.
- Oliver Gilbert Grace, Esq., OBE, Indian Police, Commandant, Frontier Constabulary, North-West Frontier Province.
- Francis Colin Minett, Esq., MBE DSc MRCVS, Director, Imperial Veterinary Research Institute, Izatnagar-Mukteswar.
- Lieutenant-Colonel (Local Brigadier) Donald MacDonald Fraser (M.Z.-2113), Indian Medical Service, seconded to Indian Army Medical Corps, Inspector of Medical Services, General Headquarters, India.
- Rai Bahadur Tridib Nath Banarji, Principal, Prince of Wales Medical College, Patna, Bihar
- Norman Loftus Bor, Esq., Indian Forest Service, Chief Refugee Administrator, Burma Refugee Organisation, Assam, and Director of Assam Relief Measures.
- John Alexander Simpson, Esq., Secretary, Military Department, India Office, London.
- Robert Mowbray, Esq., Railway Adviser and Government Director of Indian Railway Companies, India Office, London.
- Raja Baldev Singh, of Guler, Jagirdar, Nandpur, Tahsil Dehra, Kangra District, Punjab.
- Douglas Chisholm Fairbairn, Esq., Secretary, Bengal Chamber of Commerce.
- William Fleming, Esq., General Manager, Assam Oil Company, Limited, Digboi, Assam.
- Narayan Vinayak Modak, Esq., MInstCE, City Engineer, Bombay Municipality, Bombay.

=== Royal Victorian Order ===
==== Dame Commander (DCVO) ====
- Lady Isobel Constance Mary Gathorne-Hardy.

==== Knight Commander (KCVO) ====
- Clarence Henry Kennett Marten, Esq.

==== Commanders (CVO) ====
- Marion Feoderovna Louise, Lady Hyde.
- Walter Graham Scott-Brown, Esq., MD BCh FRCS
- Thomas Wright Royle, Esq., MBE (dated 1st November, 1944).
- Archibald George Blomefield Russell, Esq., MVO

==== Members (Fourth Class) (LVO) ====
- Miss Gwladys Frances Hanbury-Williams.
- William Armstrong, Esq.
- Lieutenant-Colonel Christopher Payan Dawnay, OBE (52498), Coldstream Guards (dated I5th October, 1944).
- Lieutenant-Commander (S) Ian Paton McEwan, RNVR
- Arthur Glendinning Loveless Ives, Esq.
- Austin Clement Michils, Esq., MVO.
- Lewis Stainton, Esq., MVO

=== Order of the British Empire ===
==== Knight Grand Cross (GBE) ====
- Air Chief Marshal Sir Christopher Lloyd Courtney,KCB CBE DSO, Royal Air Force.
- The Right Honourable William, Viscount Finlay, KBE, Chairman of the Blockade Committee.
- Sir James Lithgow, Bt MC TD JP DL, a Lord Commissioner of the Admiralty. Controller of Merchant Shipbuilding and Repairs.
- Lieutenant-Colonel His Highness Maharana Shri Sir Vijayasinhji Chhatrasinhji, KCSI, Maharaja of Rajpipla.

==== Knight Commander (KBE) ====
- Vice-Admiral Arthur Ninian Dowding, CB (Retired).
- Captain (S) (Acting Rear-Admiral (S)) Rowland Christopher Terrain, CBE DSO, Royal Navy.
- Captain (Acting Commodore Second Class) Arthur James Baxter, DSC RD ADC RNR.
- Captain (Acting Commodore Second Class) Roy Gill, CBE RD RNR (Retired).
- Major-General (temporary Lieutenant-General) Adrian Carton de Wiart, VC CB CMG DSO (836), retired pay, Colonel 4th/7th The Royal Dragoon Guards, Royal Armoured Corps.
- Major-General (temporary Lieutenant-General) Gordon Nevil Macready, CB CMG DSO OBE MC (22930), late Royal Engineers.
- Acting Air Marshal James Milne Robb, CB DSO DFC AFC, Royal Air Force.
- Air Vice-Marshal The Honourable Ralph Alexander Cochrane, CB CBE AFC, Royal Air Force.
- Air Vice-Marshal Lawrence Arthur Pattinson, CB DSO MC DFC, Royal Air Force (retired).
- Colonel Sir (Arthur) Stanley Angwin, DSO MC TD, Engineer-in-Chief, General Post Office.
- Robert Norman Duke, Esq., CB DSO MC, Joint Deputy Secretary, Ministry of Fuel and Power.
- Lieutenant-Colonel Vivian Beaconsfield Gray, CBE MC, Chairman, Middle East Board of Directors, United Kingdom Commercial Corporation.
- Clifford Holland Wakely, Esq., Deputy Chairman, Board of Inland Revenue.
- John Robert Patterson, Esq., CMG, Colonial Administrative Service, Chief Commissioner, Northern Provinces, Nigeria.

==== Dame Commander (DBE) ====
- Elvira Sibyl Marie, Mrs. Laughton Mathews, CBE, Director, Women's Royal Naval Service.

==== Commander (CBE) ====
- Engineer Rear-Admiral Walter Scott Hill (Retired).
- Engineer Rear-Admiral Walter Rudolph Parnall, CB (Retired).
- The Venerable Archdeacon John Kenneth Wilson, MA, Chaplain of the Fleet.
- Captain (Commodore Second Class) John Mathew Dick, VD RNVR
- Captain William Gerrard Andrewes, DSO, Royal Navy.
- Captain Leonard Hammersley Bell, OBE, Royal Navy (Retired).
- Captain Colin John Lawrence Bittleston, DSC, Royal Navy (Retired).
- Captain Cyril Aubrey Hamilton Brooking, OBE, Royal Navy (Retired).
- Captain Robert Spencer Warne, Royal Navy.
- Captain John Valentine Wotton, Royal Navy (Retired).
- Acting Captain Thomas Andrew Hussey, Royal Navy (Retired).
- Acting Captain Hugh Ray MacGregor Laird, Royal Navy (Retired).
- Acting Captain Roderick Larken Moore, Royal Navy.
- Engineer Captain Harold Henry Ring Brown, Royal Navy.
- Surgeon Captain Thomas Benjamin Dixon, MRCS LRCP KHP VD RNVR (Retired) (Dover).
- Captain (S) William Shelford Skinner, OBE, Royal Navy (Retired) (Lymm, Cheshire).
- Acting Captain (S) Frederick Robert Joseph Mack, OBE, Royal Navy (London).
- Acting Captain (S) George Frederick Pine, Royal Navy (Canford Cliffs, Dorset).
- Colonel Second Commandant (Acting Major General) Hubert Thomas Newman, Royal Marines.
- Chief Commander (temporary Controller) The Lady Maud Baillie (192040), Auxiliary Territorial Service.
- Colonel (temporary Brigadier) Alick Drummond Buchanan-Smith, OBE TD (16186), The Gordon Highlanders, Territorial Army.
- Colonel (temporary Major-General) John Buckley, DSO MC (21746), The King's Own Yorkshire Light Infantry.
- Lieutenant-Colonel (temporary Brigadier) John Albert Edward Burls, OBE AMIMechE (25781)., Royal Electrical and Mechanical Engineers, Territorial Army.
- Lieutenant-Colonel (temporary Brigadier) Edwyn Harland Wolstenholme Cobb (23655), Royal Engineers.
- Major (temporary Lieutenant-Colonel) Arthur Thomas Cornwall-Jones, OBE (171552), 5th Royal Gurkha Rifles, Indian Army.
- Colonel (temporary Brigadier) Francis Cockburn Curtis, MA AMIEE (15130), Royal Corps of Signals.
- Colonel (temporary Brigadier) Thomas Denis Daly, MC (9491), late the Royal Welch Fusiliers.
- Colonel (temporary Brigadier) Harry Hamilton Dempsey (8387), late Royal Army Service Corps.
- Colonel (temporary Brigadier) Piers Duncan William Dunn, DSO MC (5292), late The Border Regiment.
- Colonel Hugh Sidney Ellis, MC, late Royal Artillery.
- Colonel (temporary Brigadier) John Meredith Jones Evans, MC (10401), retired pay, late Royal Welch Fusiliers.
- Colonel (temporary Brigadier) Francis Ernie Fowle, MC (5050), late Royal Engineers.
- Colonel (temporary Brigadier) John Struthers Fulton, MD MRCP (Edin.) (39158), Royal Army Medical Corps, Territorial Army.
- Colonel (temporary Brigadier) Hector Robert Hume Greenfield (9216), late The Argyll and Sutherland Highlanders (Princess Louise's).
- Colonel (temporary Brigadier) Eric Llewelyn Griffith-Williams, DSO MC (20254), late Royal Artillery.
- Lieutenant-Colonel (temporary Colonel) Walter Warrington Haddock (26145), Royal Artillery.
- Colonel (temporary Brigadier) Alec Wellesley Holbrook, MC (5905), late Royal Engineers.
- Lieutenant-Colonel (temporary Colonel) Edward Robert Henry Herbert, MBE (449), The King's Shropshire Light Infantry, Territorial Army.
- Lieutenant-Colonel (temporary Brigadier) Edward Milner Holland (107910), Royal Army Service Corps.
- Lieutenant-Colonel (temporary Brigadier) Kenneth Archibald Holmes-Tarn (15295), Royal Artillery.
- Colonel (temporary Brigadier) Martin Hotine, OBE (10859), late Royal Engineers.
- Chief Commander Eleanor May, Lady James, Women's Auxiliary Corps (India).
- Colonel (temporary Brigadier) Arthur de Brisley Jenkins, OBE (901), late Royal Army Service Corps.
- Colonel (temporary Brigadier) Alban Low, MC (8698), late The Royal Irish Fusiliers (Princess Victoria's).
- Lieutenant-Colonel (temporary Brigadier) Ralph Micklem, CMG (46656), Royal Engineers.
- Colonel (temporary Brigadier) Gerald Arthur Pilleau, MC (9680), late The Queen's Royal Regiment (West Surrey).
- Colonel Thomas Wykeham Pragnell, DSO (722), late 4th Queen's Own Hussars, Royal Armoured Corps.
- Lieutenant-Colonel (temporary Colonel) Denis Walter Price (41204), Royal Engineers.
- Lieutenant-Colonel (temporary Brigadier) Horace Rupert Primmer (1156), Royal Army Ordnance Corps.
- Colonel (temporary Brigadier) John Egbert Down, OBE ED, Australian Imperial Forces.
- Colonel Bertram Sibbald Finn, DSO, New Zealand Military Forces.
- Acting Air Vice-Marshal George Dermot Daly, DFC, Royal Air Force.
- Acting Air Vice-Marshal Gerald Ernest Gibbs, MC, Royal Air Force.
- Acting Air Vice-Marshal Charles Basil Slater Spackman, DFC, Royal Air Force.
- Acting Air Vice-Marshal Sydney Edward Toomer, DFC, Royal Air Force.
- Air Commodore Dermot Alexander Boyle, AFC, Royal Air Force.
- Air Commodore Herbert Francis Fuller, Royal Air Force.
- Air Commodore Charles Edward Neville Guest, OBE, Royal Air Force.
- Air Commodore Harold Thomas Lydford, AFC, Royal Air Force.
- Air Commodore Francis John Williamson Mellersh, AFC, Royal Air Force.
- Air Commodore Robert Linton Ragg, AFC, Royal Air Force.
- Air Commodore Arthur Eilias Sutton-Jones, Royal Air Force.
- Air Commodore George Oswald Venn, Royal Air Force.
- Air Commodore Ferdinand Maurice Felix West, VC MC, Royal Air Force.
- Acting Air Commodore Cuthbert Leopold Arch'bold, OBE, Royal Air Force.
- Acting Air Commodore Charles Edward Chilton, Royal Air Force.
- Acting Air Commodore James Alfred Easton, Royal Air Force.
- Acting Air Commodore Herbert James Kirkpatrick, DFC, Royal Air Force Volunteer Reserve.
- Acting Air Commodore Alexander Hutchinson Montgomery, MBE, Royal Air Force.
- Acting Air Commodore Lionel Guy Stanhope Payne, MC AFC, Royal Air Force.
- Acting Air Commodore George Augustus Walker, DSO DFC ADC, Royal Air Force.
- Group Captain Denis Hensley Fulton Barnett, DFC, Reserve of Air Force Officers.
- Group Captain Arthur Percy Besley, TD, Auxiliary Air Force.
- Group Captain Philip Francis Canning, OBE, Royal Air Force.
- Group Captain Arthur Edgar Gerald Collins, Reserve of Air Force Officers.
- Group Captain William Joseph Crisham, Royal Air Force.
- Group Captain Roy Faville, Royal Air Force.
- Group Captain Edward Cyril Knowes Henry Foreman, MRCS LRCP, Royal Air Force.
- Group Captain Henry Paterson Fraser, AFC, Reserve of Air Force Officers.
- Group Captain Norman George Goodman, Royal Air Force.
- Group Captain John Forde Hobler, Royal Air Force.
- Group Captain Roger Glutton Mead, DFC AFC, Royal Air Force.
- Group Captain Herbert Waldemar Mermagen, OBE AFC, Royal Air Force.
- Group Captain Arthur Douglas Messenger, Royal Air Force.
- Group Captain Douglas Griffith Morris, DFC, Royal Air Force.
- Group Captain Henry William Pearson-Rogers, Royal Air Force.
- Group Captain Melvin Kenneth Drowley Porter, OBE, Royal Air Force.
- Group Captain Frederick Charles Read, Royal Air Force.
- Group Captain Conroy Richdale, Royal Air Force.
- Group Captain Jack Fendick Roulston, DSO DFC, Reserve of Air Force Officers.
- Group Captain Norman Colpoy Simpson Rutter, Royal Air Force.
- The Reverend Archibald McHardy, MC KHC, Royal Air Force.
- Acting Group Captain David de Brassey Clark, Auxiliary Air Force.
- Acting Group Captain Jack Nixon Browne, Auxiliary Air Force.
- Acting Group Captain Walter William Deane, OBE, Royal Air Force.
- Acting Group Captain Archibald Henry Harrison, DSM, Royal Air Force.
- Acting Group Captain Harold Henry Hilliar, Royal Air Force.
- Acting Group Captain Edgar Noel Lowe, Royal Air Force.
- Acting Group Captain Ernest Hector McDonald, MBE, Royal Air Force (with effect from 13th November, 1944, since killed on duty).
- Acting Group Captain Hugh Lockhard Maxwell, DSO, Royal Air Force.
- Air Commodore Raymond James Brownell, MC MM, Royal Australian Air Force.
- Group Captain Keith Logan Caldwell, MC DFC, Royal New Zealand Air Force.
- Ernest Charles Adams, Esq., M.B.E., Director, Export Credits Guarantee Department.
- Edward Barnsley, Esq., Designer and Maker of Handmade Furniture.
- Arthur Lennon Binns, Esq., M.C., M.A., Director of Education, West Riding of Yorkshire.
- Mary Georgina, Mrs. Blacklock, M.B., B.Ch., Lecturer, Liverpool School of Tropical Medicine.
- John Poland Bowen, Esq., Engineer-in-chief to the Corporation of Trinity House.
- Joseph Whiteside Boyle, Esq., Chairman, Enemy Shipping Claims Committee.
- Captain Alan Rousseau Bradshaw, R.N. (Retired), employed in a Department of the Foreign Office.
- Captain John Croumbie Brown, R.D., R.N.R. (Retired), Master, s.s. " Arundel Castle," Union-Castle Mail Steamship Company Ltd.
- Peter Ritchie Calder, Esq., employed in a Department of the Foreign Office.
- Harry Campion, Esq., Director, Central Statistical Office, Offices of the War Cabinet.
- Edward Rogers Cartwright, Esq., O.B.E., Chief Engineer, Asiatic Petroleum Company, Ltd
- Colonel Robert Chapman, C.B., C.M.G., D.S.O., T.D., J.P., D.L., Acting Chairman of the North Eastern Trading Estate Company.
- Harry Emory Chubb, Esq., O.B.E., M.I.Mech.E., Honorary Adviser to the War Department Fleet.
- Robert Henry Coverley, Esq., Controller, Rotol Airscrews Ltd.
- Vera Emily, Baroness Cranworth, Chairman, Women's Land Army, Suffolk. President of the Federation of Women's Institutes, Suffolk.
- Leonard Cuthbertson, Esq., Assistant Paymaster-General.
- George Lionel Derbyshire, Esq., O.B.E., Vice-President, London, Midland and Scottish Railway Company.
- John Darke, Esq., Regional Director, North Western Region, General Post Office.
- Arthur Sibbison Davidson, Esq., Chairman, Ministry of Commerce and Production Advisory Committee, Northern Ireland.
- Albert Cecil Dawes, Esq., Legal Adviser, Ministry of Education.
- Albert Arthur Molteno Durrant, Esq., Director of Tank Design, Ministry of Supply.
- Harold George Durston, Esq., lately Controller of Civilian Footwear.
- Waldo McGillycuddy Eagar, Esq., Secretary-General, National Institute for the Blind. Secretary, British Wireless for the Blind Fund.
- Robin Ernest William Flower, Esq., D.Litt., F.B.A., lately Senior Deputy Keeper of Manuscripts, British Museum.
- Joscelyn Plunket Bushe-Fox, Esq., F.S.A., Chief Inspector of Ancient Monuments, Ministry of Works.
- Alfred Tierney Gibson, Esq., Chief Engineer Officer, m.v. " Dominion Monarch ", Shaw Savill & Albion Company Ltd.
- Hugh Ernest Griffiths, Esq., M.S., M.B., F.R.C.S., L.R.C.P., Surgeon to the Albert Dock Hospital, and founder of the Fracture Clinic and Rehabilitation Centre. A member of the Emergency Medical Service.
- George Ernest Haynes, Esq., General Secretary, National Council of Social Service. For services to Civil Defence.
- Colonel Frank Hibbert, M.C., T.D., Water Engineer, Liverpool. For services to Civil Defence.
- Hubert Hull, Esq., Deputy Procurator-General, Department of the Procurator-General and Treasury Solicitor.
- Captain Henry Jackson, O.B.E., Commodore Master, Anglo-Saxon Petroleum Fleet, Anglo-Saxon Petroleum Company Ltd.
- Guy Francis Johnson, Esq., Chairman of the Accident Offices Association.
- John de Monins Johnson, Esq., M.A., D.Litt., Printer to the University of Oxford.
- Professor Thomas Baillie Johnston, M.D., Sector Hospital Officer, Emergency Medical Services, London.
- Major James Keith, Chairman, Board of Governors, North of Scotland College of Agriculture.
- James Rognvald Learmonth, Esq., M.B., Ch.M., F.R.C.S. (Ed.), Surgical Director, Emergency Medical Services, South-Eastern Area of Scotland, and Professor of Surgery, Edinburgh University.
- Lieutenant-Colonel James Manson McCosh, lately President and Chairman of the Scottish Pensions Appeal Tribunal.
- Robert Gumming Thomson Mair, Esq., O.B.E., M.C., Director of Education, Lanarkshire.
- Hubert Sinclair Martin, Esq., Clerk of the East Sussex County Council.
- Wing Commander Arthur Harold Measures, O.B.E., M.M., R.A.F. (Retired), Manager of the Associated Airways Joint Committee.
- Basil Edward Nicolls, Esq., Senior Controller, British Broadcasting Corporation.
- Harry Ovenden, Esq., O.B.E., F.S.I., Chief Technical Adviser, War Damage Commission.
- Richard Pares, Esq., Temporary Principal Assistant Secretary, Board of Trade.
- Lieutenant-Colonel Alfred Alexander Webster Petrie, M.D., F.R.C.S. (Ed.), D.P.M., Medical F.R.C.P., Superintendent, Banstead Mental Hospital.
- Oswald Alfred Radley, Esq., M.C., Town Clerk and Air Raid Precautions Controller, Leeds.
- Alec Lionel Rea, Esq., Honorary Deputy Director, Entertainments National Service Association.
- Oscar Stanley Norman Rickards, Esq., Director of Victualling, Admiralty.
- James Rankine Rutherford, Esq., F.C.I.S., J.P., Convener of the Executive Committee of the Convention of Royal Burghs and of Dumbarton County Council.
- Alderman Frank Gibbs Rye, O.B.E., Chairman, City of Westminster Savings Committee.
- Gerald Henry Adolphus Sington, Esq., M.I.Mech.E., Chairman, Textile Machinery and Accessories, Industrial and Export Group.
- Leon Edgar Stephens, Esq., F.S.A., Clerk and Air Raid Precautions Controller, Warwickshire County Council.
- John Richard Hugh Sumner, Esq., J.P., Chairman, Worcestershire War Agricultural Executive Committee.
- Lieutenant-Colonel Guy Symonds, D.S.O., Fire Adviser, Grade I, Home Office.
- William Ling Taylor, Esq., Forestry Commissioner.
- Charles George Twallin, Esq., Chairman and Managing Director, Buck and Hickman Ltd.
- Colonel Harry Clifford Wallis, O.B.E., Chairman of the Local Appeal Board and of the Reinstatement Committee for Bournemouth and Poole.
- Stanley Warrington, Esq., Regional Controller (London and South Eastern Region), Ministry of Labour and National Service.
- Charles William Waters, Esq., J.P., Chairman, East Norfolk Rivers Catchment Board.
- Philip Guy Rothay Whalley, Esq., Deputy Secretary, Ministry of Food.
- Francis Williams, Esq., Controller, Press Censorship and News, Ministry of Information.
- Senior Commander Philip Aubrey Wills, Air Transport Auxiliary.
- Captain James Paton Younger, J.P., D.L., Convener, Clackmannan County Council, and Chairman, Stirling and Clackmannan Joint Air Raid Precautions Authority.
- Major-General David George Bromilow, D.S.O., Inspector-General, Iraqi Army and Head of British Advisory Military Mission.
- Andrew Holden, Esq., O.B.E., a British subject resident in Egypt.
- Arthur Herbert Marlow, Esq., His Majesty's Consul-General at Buenos Aires.
- Leonard Cyril Rice, Esq., a British subject resident in Persia.
- John Kingsley Rooker, Esq., formerly Acting Counsellor on the staff of the Representative of His Majesty's Government in the United Kingdom with the French Committee of National Liberation.
- Arnold Edwards Watkinson, Esq., His Majesty's Consul-General at Beirut.
- Stanley Rupert Adams, Esq., Chairman of the Board of Management, Agricultural Bank, and Chairman of the Closer Settlement Board, State of Tasmania.
- Elsie Elizabeth, Lady Allardyce. For services rendered in relation to Forces from oversea.
- Beatrice, Mrs. Campbell. For services in connection with patriotic movements in the State of Victoria.
- George Henry Claude Crespin, Esq., Member of the Melbourne City Council, in the State of Victoria, and Chairman of the Finance Committee of the Council, for many years.
- Henry James Edward Dumbrell, Esq., O.B.E., Director of Education, Bechuanaland Protectorate.
- Edward John Wynne Fairnie, Esq., O.B.E., Commissioner, Geelong Harbour Trust, State of Victoria. For public services.
- Lawrence John Hartnett, Esq., Managing Director of General Motors-Holdens, Limited (Australia). For public services in the State of Victoria.
- The Honourable Laurence John Walter Keller, lately Minister without Portfolio, Southern Rhodesia, and recently General Secretary of the Rhodesia Railway Workers' Union.
- Raymond Charles Manning, Esq., Secretary for Public Works, Newfoundland.
- Gerald Enraght Nettelton, Esq., O.B.E., Government Secretary and Deputy Resident Commissioner, Bechuanaland Protectorate.
- William James Robinson, Esq., O.B.E., A.M.Inst.C.E., Chief Engineer, Department of Public Works, Newfoundland.
- Sreemati Rani Janaki Rathnayammarjee, Rani Regent of Gangpur.
- Major Malik Sardar Khan Noon, M.B.E., Landowner, Member, Punjab Legislative Assembly, Assistant Recruiting Officer, Gujranwala, Punjab.
- Arthur Johnson, Esq., General Manager, Post and Telegraph Phones, Calcutta District.
- John Brackendrige Ross, Esq., Regional Food Commissioner, Bombay.
- Basil Otto Stevenson, Esq., Managing Director, Ford Motor Company (India), Limited.
- Campbell Richard Derman Witcher, Esq., Additional Secretary (Communications), Reconstruction Department, Government of Burma.
- Richard Aluwihare, Esq., Acting Government Agent, North Central Province, Ceylon.
- Richard William Foxlee, Esq., M.Inst.C.E., Deputy Chief Engineer (Civil) and Deputy Head of Engineering Contracts Department, Crown Agents for the Colonies.
- Wilfred Clare Hunter, Esq., Deputy Sisal Controller, Kenya.
- Reginald Charles Marshall, Esq., Colonial Forest Service, Chief Conservator of Forests, Gold Coast.
- Gregor McGregor Peter, Esq., O.B.E. For public services in the Windward Islands.
- Henry George Robinson, Esq. For public services in Mauritius.
- George Blyth Walker, Esq., M.B., Ch.B., D.P.H., Colonial Medical Service, Deputy Director of Health Service, Nigeria.
- Ralph Ronald Waterer, Esq., Colonial Forest Service, Conservator of Forests, Cyprus.

==== Member (MBE) ====
Valjee, R.B. Jairam - contractor, industrialist and philanthropist from India

=== Companion of Honour (CH) ===
- The Right Honourable Roundell Cecil, Earl of Selborne, Minister of Economic Warfare since 1942

=== Kaisar-i-Hind ===
- Alice, Mrs. MacLeod of MacLeod (wife of Mr. A. C. M. MacLeod, C.I.E., I.C.S., Commissioner, Jullundur Division, Punjab).
- Perakathu Verghese Benjamin, Esq., Medical Superintendent, Union Mission Tuberculosis Sanatorium, Arogyavaram, and Technical Adviser to the Tuberculosis Association of India, Chittoor District, Madras.
- Dhondo Keshav Karve, Esq., Founder, Hindu Widows' Home and Indian Women's University, Hingne Budruk, Poona, Bombay.
- Norman Macpherson, Esq., Surgeon, United Missions Hospital, Vellore, and lately Doctor-in-charge, Afghan Mission Hospital, Peshawar, North-West Frontier Province.
- Colonel Henry Edward Shortt, C.I.E., Indian Medical Service, Inspector-General of Civil Hospitals, Shillong, Assam.
- Lieutenant-Colonel Frank Tomisman Simpson, M.C., lately Medical Officer in the Coalfields, Bihar.
