= List of ambassadors of the United Kingdom to Luxembourg =

The ambassador of the United Kingdom to Luxembourg is the United Kingdom's foremost diplomatic representative in the Grand Duchy of Luxembourg, and in charge of the UK's diplomatic mission in Luxembourg. The official title is His Britannic Majesty's Ambassador to the Grand Duchy of Luxembourg.

From 1815 to 1890 the King of the Netherlands was also Grand Duke of Luxembourg in personal union, so the British envoy at The Hague was also envoy to Luxembourg. After the personal union was broken in 1890 the British envoy at The Hague continued to be concurrently accredited to Luxembourg until 1922. The ambassador to Belgium was responsible for Luxembourg from 1922 until 1940, when Luxembourg was overrun by Nazi Germany. Upon liberation of Luxembourg in 1944 a chargé d'affaires was briefly resident in Luxembourg, followed by a resident military mission with diplomatic responsibility reverting to Brussels; but a resident head of mission was soon restored, in 1949. Geoffrey Alchin held the title of minister until he was upgraded to ambassador in 1955; since then the heads of mission have been ambassadors.

== List of heads of mission ==
| Name | Tenure begin | Tenure end | British monarch | Luxembourgish monarch |
|---|---|---|---|---|
| Nigel Watson (chargé d'affaires) | 1944 | 1945 | George VI | Grand Duchess Charlotte |
| Sir Hughe Knatchbull-Hugessen | 1944 | 1947 | George VI | Grand Duchess Charlotte |
| Sir Geoffrey Allchin | 1949 | 1955 | George VI | Grand Duchess Charlotte |
| Malcolm Henderson | 1955 | 1957 | Elizabeth II | Grand Duchess Charlotte |
| Harold Freese-Pennefather | 1957 | 1961 | Elizabeth II | Grand Duchess Charlotte |
| Geoffrey Aldington | 1961 | 1966 | Elizabeth II | Grand Duchess Charlotte |
| Dugald Malcolm | 1966 | 1970 | Elizabeth II | Grand Duke Jean |
| John Roper | 1970 | 1975 | Elizabeth II | Grand Duke Jean |
| Sir Antony Acland | 1975 | 1977 | Elizabeth II | Grand Duke Jean |
| Lord Wright of Richmond | 1977 | 1979 | Elizabeth II | Grand Duke Jean |
| Jeremy Thomas | 1979 | 1982 | Elizabeth II | Grand Duke Jean |
| Sir Humphrey Maud | 1982 | 1985 | Elizabeth II | Grand Duke Jean |
| Oliver Miles | 1985 | 1988 | Elizabeth II | Grand Duke Jean |
| Juliet Campbell | 1988 | 1991 | Elizabeth II | Grand Duke Jean |
| Sir Michael Pakenham | 1991 | 1994 | Elizabeth II | Grand Duke Jean |
| Nick Elam | 1994 | 1998 | Elizabeth II | Grand Duke Jean |
| Sir William Ehrman | 1998 | 2000 | Elizabeth II | Grand Duke Jean |
| Gordon Wetherell | 2000 | 2004 | Elizabeth II | Grand Duke Henri |
| James Clark | 2004 | 2007 | Elizabeth II | Grand Duke Henri |
| Peter Bateman | 2007 | 2011 | Elizabeth II | Grand Duke Henri |
| Alice Walpole | 2011 | 2016 | Elizabeth II | Grand Duke Henri |
| John Marshall | 2016 | 2021 | Elizabeth II | Grand Duke Henri |
| Fleur Thomas | 2021 | 2025 | Elizabeth II | Grand Duke Henri |
| Joanne Olivier | 2025 | | Charles III | Grand Duke Guillaume V |
