= Cloudesley Robinson =

Royal Navy Rear Admiral (1883–1959)

Sir Cloudesley Robinson
- Born: 10 June 1883; Tottenham, London, England
- Died: 1959; Wandsworth, London, England
- Relatives: Charles Napier Robinson (father)
- Military career
- Allegiance: United Kingdom
- Branch: Royal Navy
- Service years: 1897–1934; 1940–1945
- Rank: Rear-Admiral
- Commands: Flag Officer, Naval Air Stations (1943–45); HMS Courageous (1930–32); HMS Constance (1924–26); HMS Empress (1919)
- Conflicts: Boxer Rebellion; First World War; Second World War
- Awards: Knight Commander of the Order of the Bath; Mentioned in Despatches

Rear-Admiral Sir Cloudesley Varyl Robinson, KCB (10 June 1883 – 1959) was a Royal Navy officer.

== Biography ==
Robinson was born in Tottenham in London on 10 June 1883, one of three children and the only son of Alice née Wilson and Charles Napier Robinson, a commander in the Royal Navy who, on his retirement in 1882, became a journalist and author and the editor of The Navy and Army Illustrated. Cloudesley Robinson joined the Royal Navy as a cadet in January 1897. He enlivened the passing-out ceremony of December 1897 at the training ship HMS Britannia by dancing the hornpipe with cadets Reginald Watkins Grubb and Cuthbert Dixon Longstaff. Robinson had his own passing-out in 1899.

In 1900 Robinson was a midshipman on the cruiser HMS Orlando at the China Station during the Boxer Rebellion when he was set ashore with dispatches for Peking. Robinson was promoted to sub-lieutenant in April 1902 and lieutenant in August 1903. He was promoted to lieutenant-commander in August 1911 and was in the Grand Fleet aboard HMS Achilles at the commencement of the First World War in 1914 and was promoted to commander at the end of 1914.

Commander Robinson was present during the operations at Gallipoli in 1915 aboard HMS Edgar, following which he commanded the coastal patrol boats located at Osea Island in the Blackwater Estuary in Essex. He was mentioned in despatches in 1917. Robinson commanded the seaplane carrier HMS Empress in 1919, and was promoted to captain in June 1921. In November 1921, at St Peter's church in Kensington in London, he married Helen Marguerite Latreille.

Robinson was captain in charge at Singapore from 1921 to 1923, and was appointed to the command of the light cruiser HMS Constance in December 1924. Robinson was the naval attaché at Tokyo and after at Peking from 1926 to 1929. He was in command of the newly converted aircraft carrier HMS Courageous from 1930 to 1932, and was promoted to rear-admiral on 5 January 1933 before retiring at his own request in 1934. At the commencement of the Second World War, Robinson was recalled to duty as a commodore (second class) and was appointed second-in-command of the Naval Air Stations between 1940 and 1943 and was Flag Officer, Naval Air Stations for the remainder of the war, before being placed back on the retired list in August 1945. He was appointed a Knight Commander of the Order of the Bath in the same year.

Robinson died in Wandsworth in London in 1959.
