= Geoffrey Allchin =

British diplomat (1895–1968)

Sir Geoffrey Allchin KBE CMG MC

British envoy extraordinary and minister plenipotentiary to Luxembourg ambassador in 1955
- In office 1949–1955
- Preceded by: Sir Hughe Knatchbull-Hugessen
- Succeeded by: Sir Malcolm Henderson

Personal details
- Born: 10 May 1895
- Died: 10 January 1968 (aged 72) Longfield, Kent
- Education: Trinity College, Cambridge
- Occupation: Diplomat

Sir Geoffrey Cuthbert Allchin (10 May 1895 – 10 January 1968) was a British diplomat who served as ambassador to Luxembourg from 1949 to 1955.

== Early life and education ==
Allchin was born on 10 May 1895, the son of T C Allchin of Longfield, Kent. He was educated at Haileybury College and Trinity College, Cambridge.

== Career ==
Allchin served during World War I with the Royal West Kent Regiment and the Royal Engineers in France and Belgium, rose to the rank of captain, and was awarded the Military Cross.

In 1919, Allchin joined the Levant Consular Service, and in the following year was sent to Morocco. He spent the next ten years there in various posts, including at Tangier in 1920; at Fez in 1923 as vice-consul; at Safi as vice-consul in 1924; acting vice-consul at Tangier in 1925; at Tetuan as consul in 1926; Tangier again from 1926 to 1929; and then at Marrakesh as head of the vice-consulate from 1930 to 1931.

After two years at the Foreign Office he was posted to Istanbul in 1933 as consul. He then returned to the Foreign Office where, from 1943 to 1946, he served as head of the consular department with the rank of consul-general and counsellor. He was then an inspector of foreign service establishments from 1947 to 1949. In 1949, he was appointed minister and head of mission in Luxembourg, and was upgraded to ambassador in 1955 before retiring later that year.

== Personal life and death ==
Allchin married Muriel Letitia Swinfen Eady, daughter of the Ist Baron Swinfen of Chertsey, in 1940. There were no children.

Allchin died on 10 January 1968 at Longfield, Kent, aged 72.

== Honours ==
Allchin was appointed Companion of the Order of St Michael and St George (CMG) in the 1945 New Year Honours. He was appointed Knight Commander of the Order of the British Empire (KBE) in the 1954 Birthday Honours. He was awarded the Military Cross (MC) in 1918 for service during World War I.

== See also ==
- Luxembourg–United Kingdom relations

Diplomatic posts
Preceded by Sir Hughe Knatchbull-Hugessen	British envoy extraordinary and minister plenipotentiary to Luxembourg ambassador in 1955; 1949–1955	Succeeded by Sir Malcolm Henderson
