= Frederick Golden Short =

British painter (1863–1936)

Frederick Golden Short (1863–1936) was a British painter, who specialized in landscapes. Short was born in Lyndhurst, which is situated in the New Forest National Park in Hampshire. Growing up in such close proximity to the New Forest, this is a common subject of his paintings. Short worked primarily with oil paint, and occasionally watercolor.

Short exhibited at the leading galleries of the time, including The Royal Academy of Arts, The Royal Society of British Artists, the Royal Institute of Oil Painters, The Royal Institute of Painters in Water Colours, and the New Gallery.

As well as an exhibition painter, Short created illustrations for books and publications. His work made an appearance in Good Words, Volume 23 (1882). He created 70 illustrations for Sylvan Winter, (1886) by Francis George Heath, as well as 18 illustrations for Autumnal Leaves (1885) by the same author. According to Heath in Sylvan Winter:

"The Artist [Short] living amidst the most beautiful woodland scenery in this country, had learnt his art from the great book of Nature, with a touch which no mere art-training could give."

Today his art is widely collected and is held in collections such as Astley Hall Museum and Art Gallery, Southampton City Art Gallery, Russell-Cotes Art Gallery & Museum, and many more.

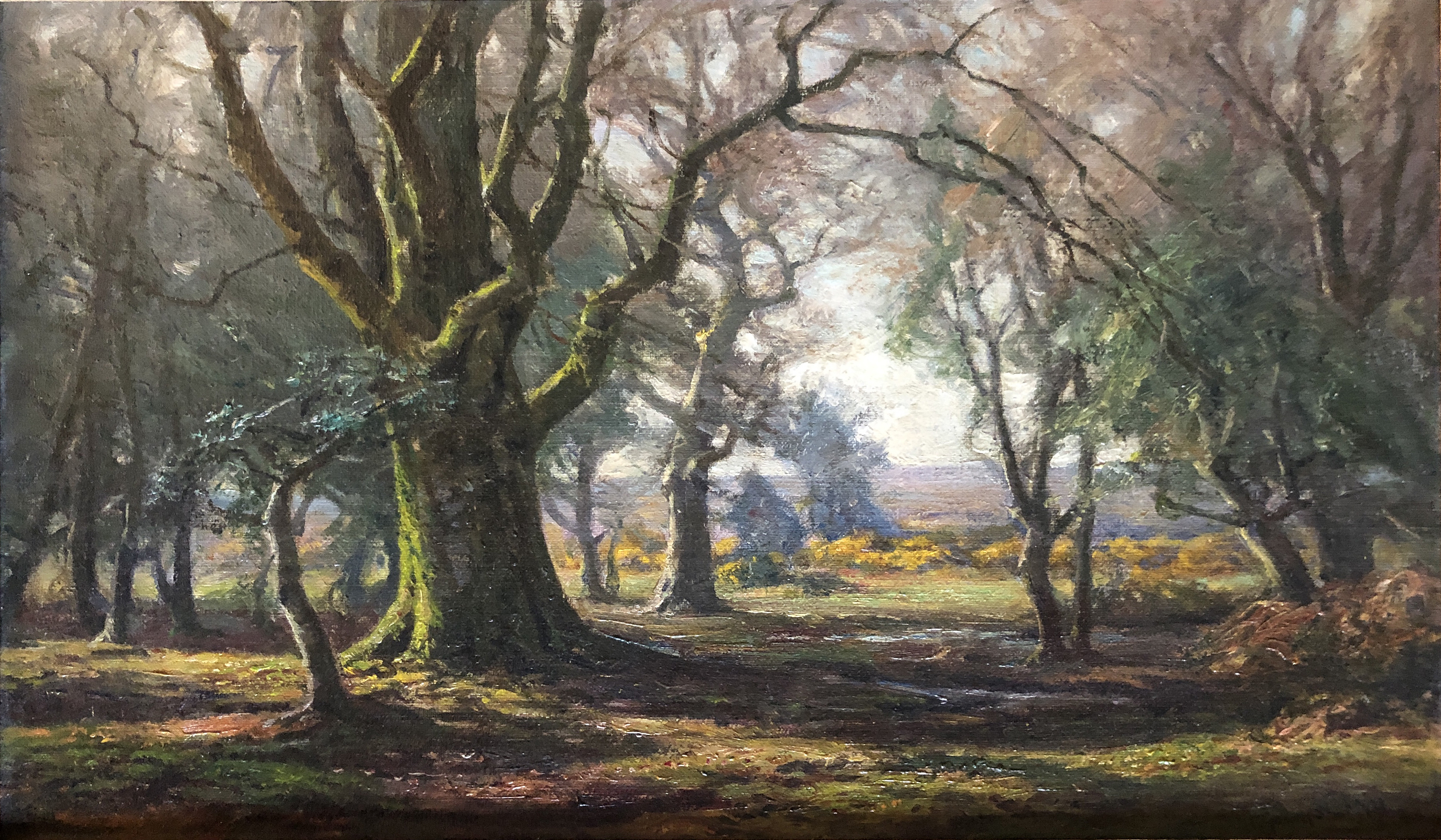
"Spring Sunlight - New Forest", 1934, Frederick Golden Short

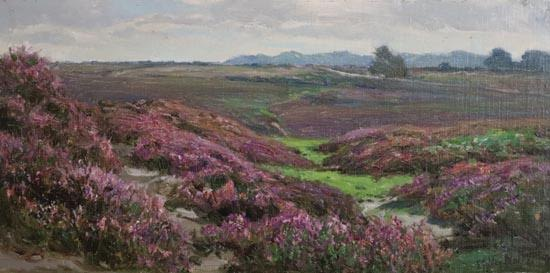
"New Forest Landscape" 1926, Frederick Golden Short

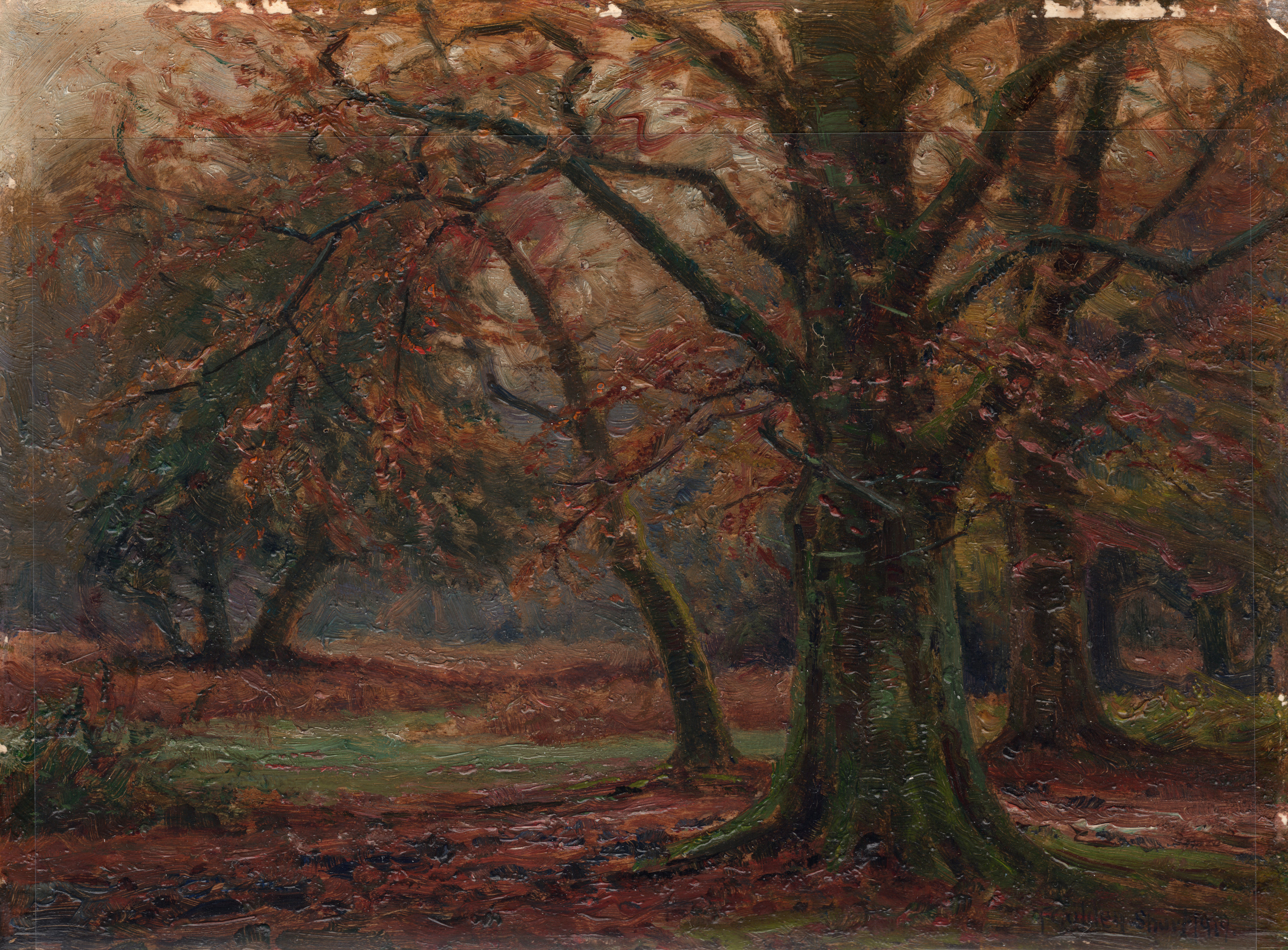
"New Forest in Autumn" 1919, Frederick Golden Short

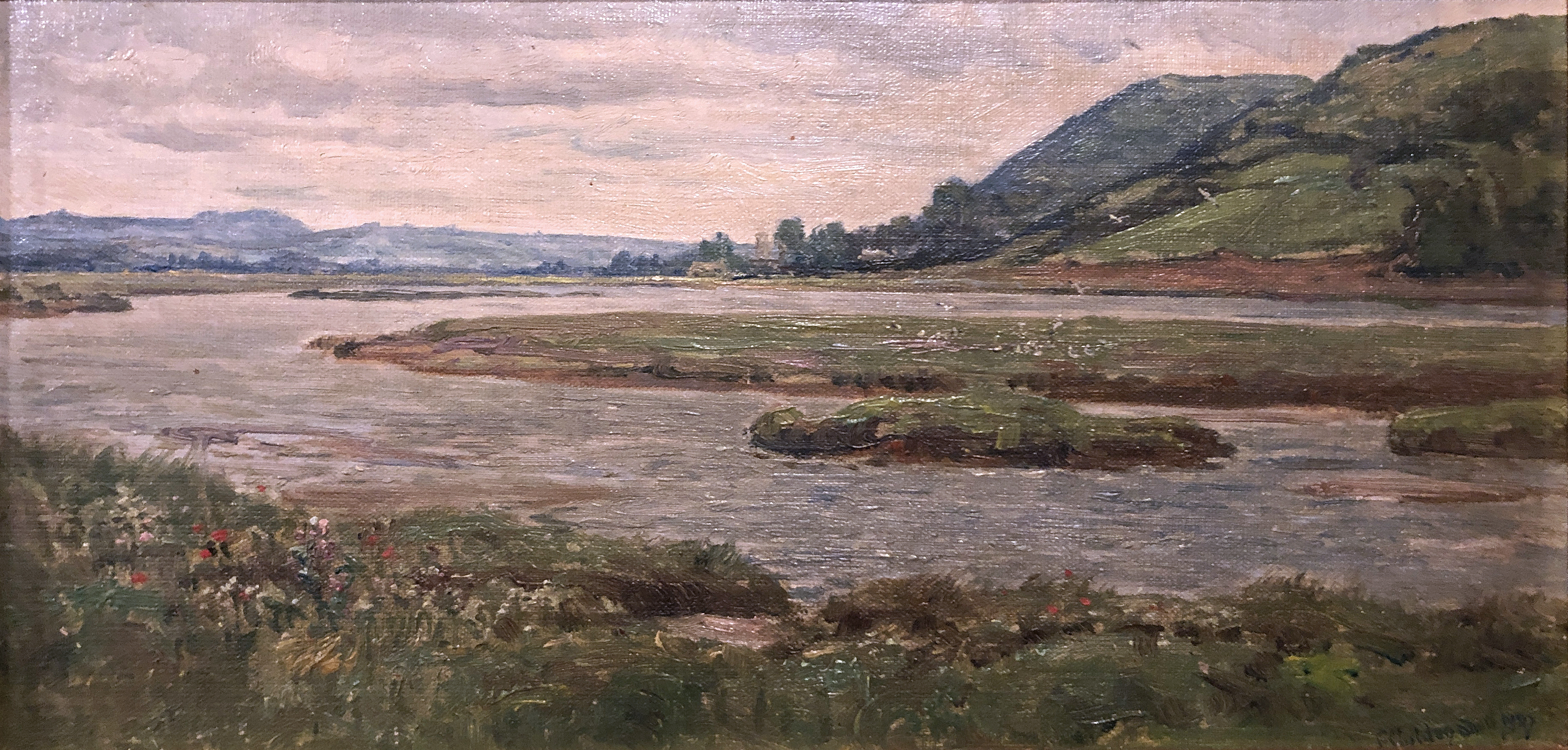
"River Landscape - South Coast" 1927, Frederick Golden Short

== Short as a Photographer ==
In addition to painting and sketching, Short was also a photographer. His photos were published in books and periodicals featuring the New Forest as the subject. Some of these publications include Memorials of Old Hampshire (1906) by George Edward Jeans, Lure of the Forest (1925) Elizabeth Croly, and Navy and Army Illustrated, Volume 16 No. 334 (1903).

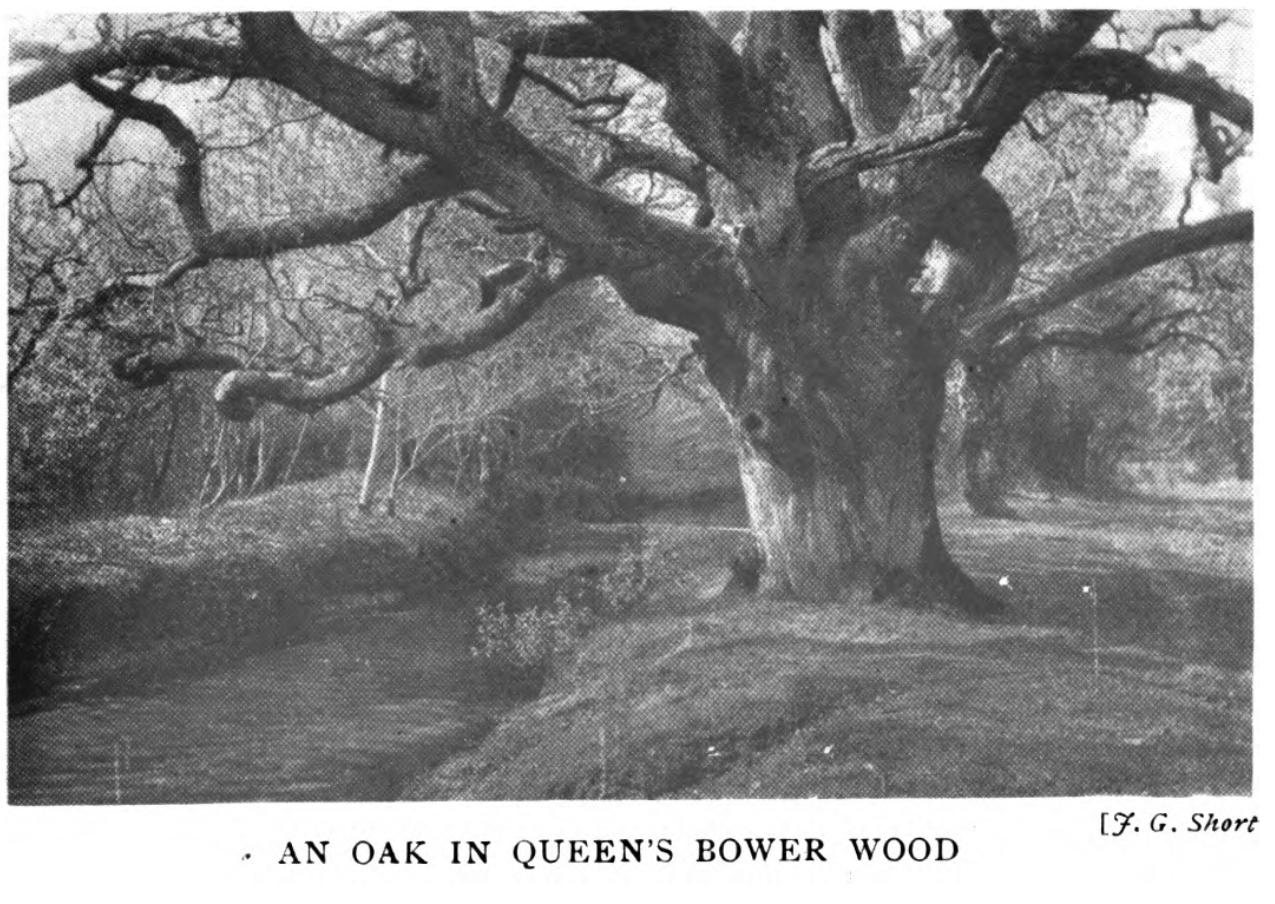
"An Oak in Queen's Bower Wood", 1925 by Frederick Golden Short

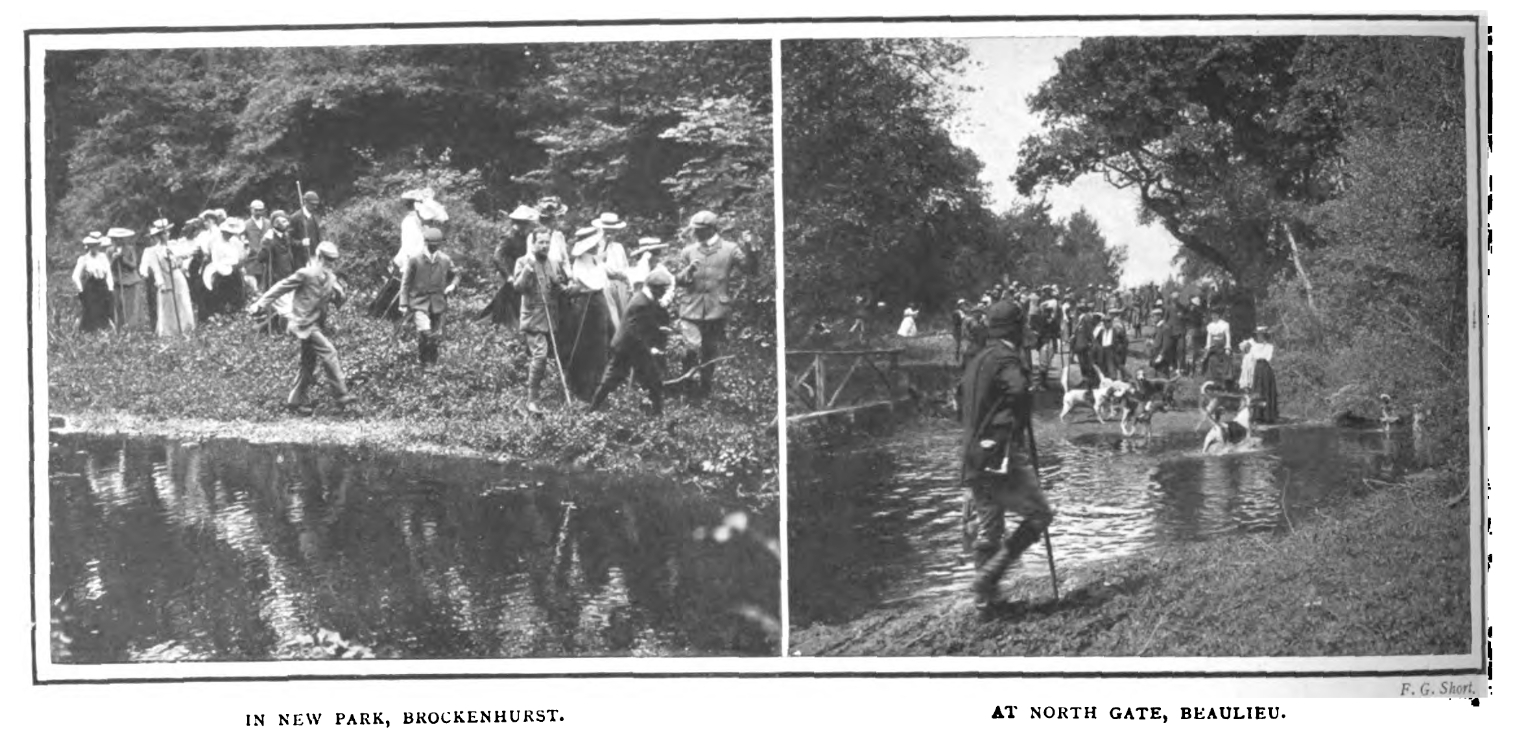
New Forest Hunting Scene, 1903 by Frederick Golden Short

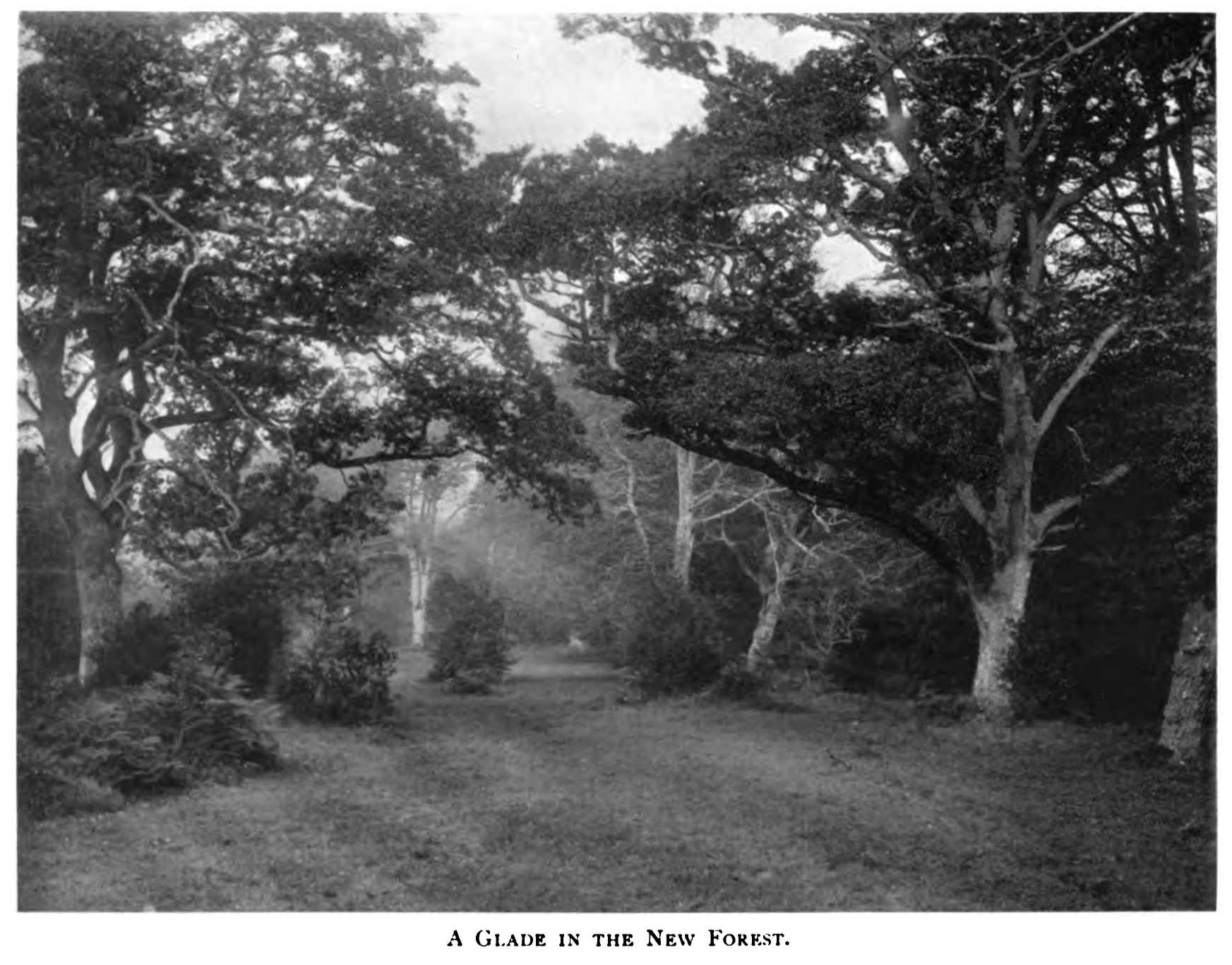
"A Glade in the New Forest", 1906 by Frederick Golden Short
