= Dugald Malcolm =

British diplomat (1917–2000)

Captain Dugald Malcolm CMG CVO TD

Vice-Marshal of the Diplomatic Corps
- In office 1957–1965
- Preceded by: Marcus Cheke
- Succeeded by: Alexander Lees Mayall

Ambassador to Luxembourg
- In office 1966–1970
- Preceded by: Geoffrey Aldington
- Succeeded by: John Roper

Ambassador from the United Kingdom to Panama
- In office 1971–1974
- Preceded by: Ronald Stratford Scrivener
- Succeeded by: Robert Michael John

Envoy Extraordinary and Minister Plenipotentiary to the Holy See
- In office 1975–1977
- Preceded by: Desmond Crawley
- Succeeded by: Geoffrey Crossley

Personal details
- Born: 22 December 1917
- Died: 16 February 2000 (aged 82)
- Parent: Maj Gen Neill Malcolm (father)
- Education: Eton College
- Alma mater: New College, Oxford
- Military career
- Allegiance: United Kingdom
- Branch: British Army
- Service years: 1939–1945
- Rank: Captain
- Unit: Argyll and Sutherland Highlanders
- Conflicts: World War II

Captain Dugald Malcolm, CMG CVO TD (22 December 1917 – 16 February 2000) was a British diplomat, Her Britannic Majesty's Envoy Extraordinary and Minister Plenipotentiary to the Holy See 1975–1977.

Malcolm was born in 1917, the son of Major-General Sir Neill Malcolm, and educated at Eton College and New College, Oxford. After serving in the Argyll and Sutherland Highlanders in the Second World War, he joined the Foreign Office in 1945.

He was Her Majesty's Vice-Marshal of the Diplomatic Corps 1957–1965, then Ambassador to Luxembourg 1966–1970, and Ambassador to Panama 1971–1974. From 1975 to 1977 served as Minister Plenipotentiary to the Vatican.

Malcolm was a member of the Queen's Bodyguard for Scotland (Royal Company of Archers).

== See also ==
- British Ambassadors to the Holy See.

Diplomatic posts
Preceded by Marcus Cheke	Vice-Marshal of the Diplomatic Corps; 1957 – 1965	Succeeded by Alexander Lees Mayall
Preceded by Geoffrey Aldington	Ambassador to Luxembourg; 1965 – 1970	Succeeded by John Roper
Preceded by Ronald Stratford Scrivener	Ambassador from the United Kingdom to Panama; 1970 – 1974	Succeeded by Robert Michael John
Preceded by Desmond Crawley	Envoy Extraordinary and Minister Plenipotentiary to the Holy See; 1975 – 1977	Succeeded by Geoffrey Crossley
