= James Clark (British diplomat) =

British diplomat (born 1963)

James Clark (born 12 March 1963) is a British former diplomat. He served as the British Ambassador to Luxembourg from 2004 to 2007 and now leads the British Consulate General in Chicago. He was called "a new breed of diplomat" by The Times. A career diplomat, he was assigned to the European Union first secretariat in Bonn, Germany.

Clark's appointment as British Ambassador to Luxembourg in March 2004 was heralded with some small controversy, due largely to his being openly gay.

On 30 March 2004, he and his partner Anthony Stewart made history by becoming the first officially recognised gay couple to have an audience with Queen Elizabeth II.

Diplomatic posts
Preceded by Gordon Wetherell	British Ambassador to Luxembourg; 2004–2007	Succeeded by Peter Bateman
