= Geoffrey Aldington =

British diplomat (1907–1992)

Sir Geoffrey Aldington KBE CMG

British Ambassador to Luxembourg
- In office 1961–1966
- Preceded by: Harold Freese-Pennefather
- Succeeded by: Dugald Malcolm

Personal details
- Born: 1 June 1907 London
- Died: 19 February 1992 (aged 84)
- Children: 2
- Education: Magdalen College, Oxford
- Occupation: Diplomat

Sir Geoffrey William Aldington (1 June 1907 – 19 February 1992 ) was a British diplomat who served as ambassador to Luxembourg from 1961 to 1966.

== Early life and education ==
Aldington was born in London on 1 June 1907, the son of Henry William Aldington. He was educated at City of London School and Magdalen College, Oxford.

== Career ==
Aldington joined the Far Eastern consular service in 1929 as a student interpreter. Two years later he was appointed a vice-consul and served in Peking from 1931 to 1933. After spending two years at the Foreign Office as secretary to Sir Alexander Cadogan who was later head of the Foreign Office, he returned to China as acting consul at Chungking, and in 1938 was promoted to consul. In 1939, he was transferred to Tsingtao, and after Japan invaded China he and his wife were incarcerated by the Japanese army until they were released before the end of the war as part of an exchange of detained diplomats.

In 1943, he was seconded to the Ministry of Information in Delhi dealing with propaganda, and later served with the Southeast Asian command led by Lord Mountbatten. After the war, he returned to China in 1945 as acting consul-general at Hankow, and later superintending consul at Shanghai. In 1947, he returned to the Foreign Office where he was appointed head of the Information Services department.

Despite his later ambassadorial appointment, according to The Times, "it was as a Sinologist that Aldington made his name." It was due to his linguistic skills, taking a double first in French and German at Oxford, that he was recruited by the Foreign Office as a language cadet and sent to China. He spent over 20 years in various posts in the country and gained "a deep understanding of China and its culture." In 1949, during the Shanghai Campaign when the Chinese communists took control of the city from the nationalists, Aldington, who was consul there, escaped to Hong Kong where for three years his extensive knowledge and experience of the region was put to good use as political adviser to the British colony.

In 1954, he was appointed consul-general to the People's Republics of Croatia, Montenegro and Slovenia, at Zagreb, and in 1956, consul-general at Philadelphia. In 1961, he was appointed ambassador to Luxembourg,and also in the following year, consul-general, a post he held until his retirement in 1966.

== Personal life and death ==
Aldington married Roberta Finch in 1932, and they had two daughters.

Aldington died on 19 February 1992, aged 84.

== Honours ==
Aldington was appointed Companion of the Order of St Michael and St George (CMG) in the 1958 Birthday Honours. He was appointed Officer of the Order of the British Empire (OBE) in the 1946 Birthday Honours, and promoted to Knight Commander of the Order of the British Empire (KBE) in the 1965 Birthday Honours.

== See also ==
- Luxembourg–United Kingdom relations

Diplomatic posts
Preceded by Harold Freese-Pennefather	British Ambassador to Luxembourg; 1961–1966	Succeeded by Dugald Malcolm
