= Lees Mayall =

British diplomat

Sir Alexander Lees Mayall KCVO CMG (14 September 1915 – 27 December 1992) was a British diplomat who served as Vice-Marshal of the Diplomatic Corps.

== Biography ==
Mayall was born in Atcham, Shropshire, the son of Alexander Mayall, of Bealings End, Woodbridge, Suffolk, by his wife Isobel Margaret, daughter of Frederick James Roberts Hendy, Director of Education at Oxford University. The Mayall family were minor Lancashire gentry since the late eighteenth century.

After Eton and Trinity College, Oxford, Mayall joined the Foreign Office and was promoted to Third Secretary in 1940. He was appointed a Companion of the Order of St Michael and St George in 1964 while serving at the British embassy in Lisbon.

From 1940 to 1965, he was en poste in British Embassies in Switzerland, Egypt, France, Japan, Portugal and Ethiopia as well as serving stints in the UK. He served as Vice-Marshal of the Diplomatic Corps between 1965 and 1972, and was invested as a Knight Commander of the Royal Victorian Order in recognition of his services. In 1973 he was appointed British Ambassador to Venezuela. After he retired to Wiltshire in 1975, he published his memoirs entitled Fireflies in Amber (ISBN 0 85955 162 8) published by Michael Russell (Publishing) Ltd, The Chantry, Wilton, Salisbury.

In 1940, Mayall married Renee Eileen, daughter of Sir (Roland) Clive Wallace Burn, K.C.V.O.; they had a daughter, and divorced in 1947. He married secondly, on 24 January 1947, Hon. Mary Hermione Ormsby-Gore, formerly wife of Capt. Robin Francis Campbell, D.S.O., and daughter of William Ormsby-Gore, 4th Baron Harlech by his wife Lady Beatrice Edith Mildred Gascoyne-Cecil. They had a son and two daughters.

Mayall was a friend and neighbour of the writer Anthony Powell, featuring regularly in his Journals.

Diplomatic posts
Preceded by Dugald Malcolm	Vice-Marshal of the Diplomatic Corps; 1957 – 1965	Succeeded by John Curle
