= Charles Napier Robinson =

English journalist and story writer

Charles Napier Robinson (27 January 1849 – 14 September 1936) was an English journalist and story writer. After a career in the Royal Navy, during which he achieved the rank of Commander, he became a journalist, specialising in naval matters. In his lifetime Robinson witnessed the Naval Review of 1854 and the Silver Jubilee Review of 1936 and as a participant, spectator or correspondent he witnessed all the Naval Reviews of the 80 years between. During his military service he witnessed fighting during the American Civil War.

He was born in Thanet in Kent in 1849, one of five children of Anne and Alexander Robinson, a Paymaster 1st Class and Purser in the Royal Navy. In 1861 aged 13 Charles Robinson joined the Royal Navy and was promoted Lieutenant in September 1872. He was Mentioned in Despatches for actions against slaving dhows off the East African coast. After twenty years of service he retired early in July 1882 under the Childers Scheme with the rank of Commander. In 1882 at St. George's church in Bloomsbury in London he married 20 year-old Alice Wilson (1862-) with whom he had three children. His son was Rear Admiral Sir Cloudesley Varyl Robinson, KCB (1883-1959).

Between 1895 and 1903 Robinson was the editor of the periodical The Navy and Army Illustrated. He was assistant editor of the Army and Navy Gazette and a founder of the Society for Nautical Research being a member of the original Council of 1910-11 and was a member of the Publication Committee. In 1921 he became a Vice-President and in 1931 was appointed an Honorary Vice-President. After his long and a distinguished service in the Royal Navy he became the Naval Correspondent for The Times, a position he held for 45 years and was editor of The Naval Annual. Robinson was also "a prolific author who had a considerable impact on how naval history was both written and understood" and was a writer of naval fiction. He received the Royal United Services Institute’s Chesney Medal for his contribution to naval literature. His book The British Fleet, the Growth, Achievements, and Duties of the Navy of the Empire (1894) became essential reading for naval officers from many countries. A Freemason, in 1898 as a 'Retired Commander (RN)' he joined the Navy Lodge No.2612.

His daughter Marjorie (1898–1984) married Geoffrey Lawrence, 1st Baron Oaksey.

In his later years Robinson lived at 19 Esmond Gardens in Bedford Park in Chiswick. On his death his estate was valued at £4,316 8s 11d.

== Works ==
- Robinson, Charles Napier (1895), The British fleet : the growth, achievements and duties of the Navy of the Empire (2nd ed.), George Bell
- Robinson, Charles Napier, China of Today or the Yellow Peril, The Navy and Army Illustrated : Geo. Newnes, c.1900
- Robinson, Charles Napier; Leyland, John, 1857?-1924 (1909), The British Tar in fact and fiction : the poetry, pathos, and humour of the sailor's life, Harper
- Introduction of - Cust, Charles Leopold; Robinson, Charles Napier, 1849-1936; Parker, Harry (1911), Naval battles from the collection of prints formed and owned by Commander Sir Charles Leopold Cust : the chronological arrangement of the prints with descriptive and historical notes, T. H. Parker
- Editor/Publisher of - Robinson, Charles Napier, 1849-1936 (1895), Navy and army illustrated : a magazine descriptive and illustrative of everyday life in the defensive service of the British Empire, Hudson & Kearns, etc
