= Reginald Kerr =

British Army general (1897–1974)

Major-General Sir Reginald Kerr KBE CB MC*
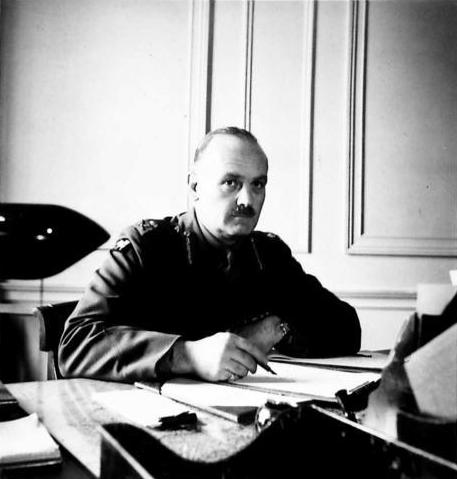
- Kerr in 1943
- Born: 22 April 1897
- Died: 1 November 1974 (aged 77); Lyme Regis, Dorset, England
- Military career
- Allegiance: United Kingdom
- Branch: British Army
- Service years: 1914–1949
- Rank: Major-General
- Service number: 17076
- Unit: Royal Army Service Corps
- Conflicts: First World War; Second World War
- Awards: Knight Commander of the Order of the British Empire; Companion of the Order of the Bath; Military Cross & Bar; Mentioned in Despatches

Major-General Sir Harold Reginald Kerr, KBE, CB, MC & Bar (22 April 1897 – 1 November 1974) was a British Army officer who saw service during both the First and Second World Wars.

== Military career ==
Born on 22 April 1897, Reginald Kerr was educated at Bedford School and at the Royal Military College, Sandhurst. He received his commission in the British Army in 1914, serving in the Army Service Corps (later the Royal Army Service Corps) in France and Flanders during the First World War, gaining the Military Cross in 1918, and subsequently serving on the staff of the British Army of the Rhine in Germany until 1920.

Remaining in the army during the interwar period, Kerr married in 1921 and was an instructor at Sandhurst from 1924 to 1928, before receiving an appointment as adjutant at the RASC Training Centre from 1929 to 1930. He then attended the Staff College, Camberley, from 1931 to 1932, where he came into contact with future generals such as Brian Horrocks, Sidney Kirkman, Thomas Rees and Joseph Baillon and Frank Simpson, who were among his numerous fellow students. This was followed by a posting to the Sudan as a staff officer, in 1934, before returning to England where he again served as a staff officer, this time with the 3rd Division, from 1935 to 1936, and then was chief instructor at the RASC Training Centre, holding this position from 1937 to 1939. The outbreak of war found him back at the Staff College, Camberley, this time serving as an instructor.

During the Second World War, Kerr was on the British Army Staff in Washington, D.C. from June 1941 to November 1942, major general in charge of administration, Eastern Command, from December 1942 to May 1943, and Director of Supplies and Transport at the War Office from 1943 to 1946. He was major general in charge of Administration, Far East Land Forces, from 1946 to 1948, and retired from the British Army in 1949. He was Chairman of the British Waterways Board between 1955 and 1962.

Kerr was appointed a Companion of the Order of the Bath in 1945, and as a Knight Commander of the Order of the British Empire in 1946. He died in Lyme Regis, Dorset, on 1 November 1974.

== Bibliography ==
- Smart, Nick (2005). Biographical Dictionary of British Generals of the Second World War. Barnesley: Pen & Sword. ISBN 1844150496.
