= HMS Constance (1915) =

Royal Navy C-class light cruiser

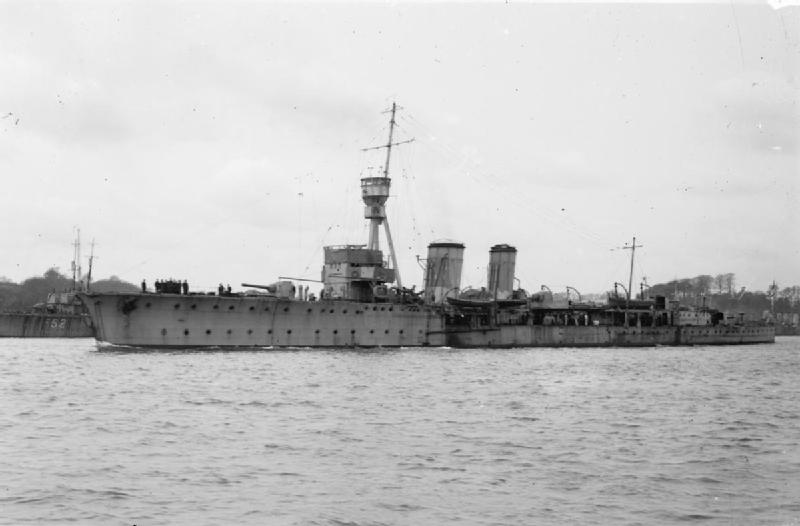
- Constance departing Devonport in March 1919

History

United Kingdom
- Name: Constance
- Builder: Cammell Laird
- Laid down: 25 January 1915
- Launched: 12 September 1915
- Completed: January 1916
- Commissioned: January 1916
- Decommissioned: March 1931
- Identification: Pennant number: C5 (1914); 49 (Jan 18); 90 (Apr 18); 81 (Nov 19).
- Fate: Sold 8 June 1936 for scrapping

General characteristics
- Class & type: C-class light cruiser
- Displacement: 3,750 long tons (3,810 t)
- Length: 446 ft (136 m)
- Beam: 41.5 ft (12.6 m)
- Draught: 15 ft (4.6 m)
- Installed power: 8 Yarrow boilers; 40,000 shp (30,000 kW)
- Propulsion: 4 shafts; 2 steam turbines
- Speed: 28.5 knots (52.8 km/h; 32.8 mph)
- Complement: 323
- Armament: 4 × single 6 in (152 mm) guns; 1 × single 4 in (102 mm) gun; 2 × single 3 in (76 mm) guns; 2 × single 2 pdr (40 mm (1.6 in)) AA guns; 2 × twin 21 in (533 mm) torpedo tubes
- Armour: 3 inch side (amidships); 2¼-1½ inch side (bows); 2½ - 2 inch side (stern); 1 inch upper decks (amidships); 1 inch deck over rudder

HMS Constance was a C-class light cruiser of the Royal Navy that saw service in World War I. She was part of the Cambrian group of the C class.

== Construction ==
Constance was laid down on 25 January 1915, launched on 12 September 1915, and completed in January 1916.

== Service history ==
=== World War I ===
Commissioned into service in the Royal Navy in January 1916, Constance was assigned to the 4th Light Cruiser Squadron of the Grand Fleet from her commissioning until 1919, taking part in the Battle of Jutland on 31 May-1 June 1916.

=== Postwar ===
After the conclusion of World War I, Constance was assigned to the 8th Light Cruiser Squadron on the North America and West Indies Station (subsequently the America and West Indies Station) from 1919 to 1926, based at the Royal Naval Dockyard in the Imperial fortress colony of Bermuda, where she escaped damage though torn free from the wharf when a hurricane struck on 21 September, 1922, recommissioning at Devonport in January 1923 to continue this service. From September 1926 to December 1927, she underwent a refit at Chatham Dockyard, becoming the flagship of the Portsmouth Reserve upon its completion. She was assigned to the 5th Cruiser Squadron on the China Station from 1928 to November 1930.

In March 1931, Constance was decommissioned, transferred to the Reserve Fleet, and placed in reserve at Portsmouth, remaining in reserve there until July 1935.

== Disposal ==
Constance was sold in January 1936 or on 8 June 1936 (sources differ) to Arnott Young, of Dalmuir, Scotland, to be scrapped.
