= Henry Speldewinde de Boer =

Ceylonese-born British colonial doctor

Captain Dr Henry Speldewinde de Boer, CMG, MC (1889–1957) was a Ceylonese-born British colonial doctor. He was the former Director of Medical Services in Uganda and Nyasaland as well as being elected as County Councillor for the Hemel Hempstead division of Hertfordshire.

Born in Colombo, Ceylon, he was educated at the Royal College, Colombo and went on to England for medical studies at the London Hospital. There he gained his MRCS and LRCP in 1913. With the out break of World War I he joined the British Army and was commissioned as a temporary Lieutenant on 12 January 1915 in the Royal Army Medical Corps. He served in the Gallipoli Campaign with the 1st Battalion, Royal Dublin Fusiliers, during which he was wounded. During the war he received the Military Cross in 1918 and was mentioned in dispatches. He resigned from his commissioned with the rank of captain in 1920 and gain a Diploma of Public Health from the University of Cambridge.

Entering the Colonial Medical Service, as a medical officer in Kenya. In 1923, he returned to London to gain his DTM&H. Thereafter he was appointed a senior health officer in East Africa in 1926, serving in Kisumu and Mombasa. In the former he was the local tennis champion. Moving to Northern Rhodesia in 1931 on his appointment as Deputy Director of Sanitary Services and two years later he became the Deputy Director of Medical Services in Uganda. In 1938 he was appointed as Director of Medical Services in Nyasaland where he stayed till 1942. Thereafter he returned to Uganda as Director of Medical Services, holding the post till 1947 when he retired. In Kisumu a street as well as a mosquito, Aedes de boeri is named after him. From 1938 to 1939 he was the President of the Nyasaland Branch of the British Medical Association and was made a Companion of the Order of St Michael and St George in 1945. He retired to England and became a temporary medical officer at the Ministry of Health, later being appointed airport medical officer at Northolt. He was also elected as County Councillor for the Hemel Hempstead division of Hertfordshire. He died in Hemel Hempstead in 1957.

He married Frances Ethel Bartholomeusz in 1920 daughter of John Oliver Bartholomeusz, Assistant Colonial Surgeon. They had two sons, Charles and John, with Charles becoming a noted obstetrician and gynaecologist.
