= Malcolm Henderson (diplomat) =

British diplomat

Sir Malcolm Siborne Henderson, KCMG (21 April 1905 – 11 May 1981) was a British diplomat. He served as British ambassador to Luxembourg, Uruguay, and Austria.
