= The Navy and Army Illustrated =

British military magazine 1895 to 1915

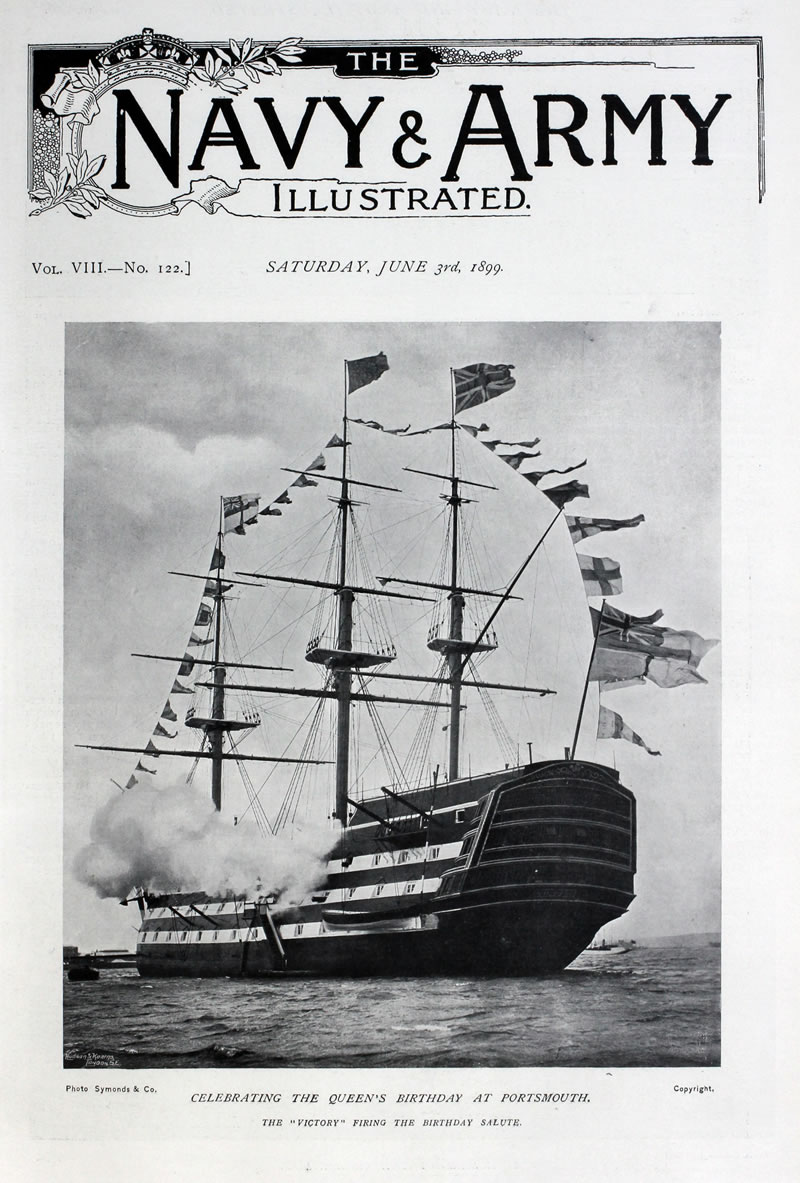
Cover of The Navy and Army Illustrated (1899)

The Navy and Army Illustrated was an illustrated glossy journal or magazine that covered historical and contemporary military matters from 1895 to 1915.

First published in 1895 by George Newnes, The Navy and Army Illustrated described itself as 'A Magazine Descriptive and Illustrative of Everyday Life in the Defensive Services of the British Empire'. The first series, published between 1895 and 1903, was edited by Commander Charles Napier Robinson. Originally published fortnightly and priced at 6d, its publication was later increased to weekly. From 1903 it amalgamated with The King, another magazine from the same publishing house and was renamed The King and His Navy and Army following which much of the military content was dropped and by 1905 interest in the magazine was fading. It was relaunched in 1906 and again in August 1914 with the outbreak of World War I when it was republished in a new series and reverted to its original title.

The magazine was aimed at a wide audience - 'all who are interested in the welfare of the British Empire and those who had friends or relatives in the service of the Queen' - and profusely illustrated with photographs and artwork in black and white, of battleships, historic military events such as battles, military parades, officers and men in elaborate uniforms and soldiers and sailors going about their duties, set against a backdrop of the home barracks such as Aldershot contrasted with settings from the far flung and exotic British Empire. For many young men who sought a life of travel and adventure the magazine was a subtle means of recruitment into the pre-WWI British armed forces, encouraging them to serve 'Queen or King and Country'.

While much of the periodical's content concerned the might and majesty of the Royal Navy and British Army occasionally more human experiences were covered such as the story of the brave young sailor 1st Class Boy C. R. Field who in a posed photograph taken on board the training ship Impregnable in 1897 proudly wears the bronze Brave Conduct Medal awarded to him by the Royal Humane Society for his unsuccessful attempt to rescue a drowning comrade who had fallen overboard one night. Without thought for his own personal safety Field had leapt into the stormy sea but soon got into difficulty himself leading to both being rescued by a boat.

It is presumed that publication ended sometime during 1915 as no volumes after that year are held in any of the national libraries.
