= Guardian Student Media Award =

Defunct student journalism competition ran in the UK

The Guardian Student Media Awards were an annual UK-wide student journalism competition run by The Guardian newspaper. They were cancelled from 2016 onwards to save costs.

== History ==
Since 1947, The National Union of Students (NUS) have run a student journalism competition of some kind. In 1978, The Guardian joined forces with the NUS for the inaugural NUS/Guardian Student Media Awards.

In the early years the competition was modest. Only a handful of categories - for Best Paper, Best Magazine, Best Photographer and Best Journalist existed - along with awards for student radio.

During the 1990s, the individual print categories began to rise exponentially, and today include Reporter, Feature writer, Critic, Sports writer, Diversity writer, Travel writer and Columnist. Meanwhile, the broadcast categories were dropped after the judges consistently reported insufficient quality to yield a shortlist. Other categories added included Publication Design and Website. Small Budget Publication was also added, but it has now been replaced by Student Broadcaster.

Since 1999, The Guardian and the NUS have run separate student journalism awards. The Guardian's are now simply called the Guardian Student Media Awards. The NUS meanwhile, launched the National Student Journalism Awards, which have been sponsored by The Independent (1999-2002), The Daily Mirror (2003-2005), The Press Association (2006- 2015) and Citizen Training (2016-)

== Format ==
The Awards are launched in July each year, with a closing date at the beginning of September. Typically students are required to send their best three articles from the past academic year to be critiqued by a panel of senior national journalists. In early November, a shortlist of five entrants per category is printed in Media section of the newspaper. The winners and runners-up in each category, along with an overall student reporter of the year, are announced at a London ceremony at the beginning of December.

As of the 2014 awards, submissions were invited in the following categories:

- A Student publication
- B Student website
- C Student reporter
- D Student feature writer
- E Student columnist
- F Student critic
- G Student photographer
- H Student digital journalist
- I Student broadcast journalist

== Previous winners ==
=== Publication of the Year ===
Publication of the Year	Winner	University	Runner-up	University
2014	York Vision	University of York	Nouse	University of York
2013	The Courier	Newcastle University	York Vision	University of York
2012	The Courier	Newcastle University	Nouse	University of York
2011	York Vision	University of York	Mouth	Kingston University
2010	The River	Kingston University	Student Direct: The Mancunion	University of Manchester
2009	Leeds Student	University of Leeds	Gair Rhydd	Cardiff University
2008	Felix	Imperial College London	Nouse	University of York
2007	York Vision	University of York	The Oxford Student	University of Oxford
2006	Felix	Imperial College London	Sheffield Steel Press	University of Sheffield
2005	Gair Rhydd	Cardiff University	Nouse	University of York
2004	York Vision	University of York	Leeds Student	University of Leeds
2003	York Vision	University of York	Warwick Boar	University of Warwick
2002	York Vision	University of York	The University Observer	University College Dublin
2001	The Oxford Student	Oxford University	The Saint	St Andrews University
2000	Sheffield Steel Press	Sheffield University	The Beaver	LSE
1999	Leeds Student	University of Leeds	Palatinate	Durham University

=== Website of the Year ===
Website of the Year	Winner	University	Runner-up	University
2013	The Student Journals	University of Southampton	Cherwell	University of Oxford
2012	Sheffield Unchained	University of Sheffield	Redbrick	University of Birmingham
2011	Redbrick	University of Birmingham	The Student Journals	University of Warwick
2010				
2009	Nouse	University of York		
2008	Cherwell	University of Oxford	Nouse	University of York
2007	Live!	Imperial College London	Nouse	University of York
2006	Warwick Boar	University of Warwick	www.bloc-online.com	University College Falmouth
2005	Pulse FM	London School of Economics	Warwick Boar	University of Warwick
2004	Wessex Scene	University of Southampton	Scan	Lancaster University
2003	Blunt	Cardiff University	Wessex Scene	University of Southampton
2002	York Vision	York University	Varsity	Cambridge University
2001	Preston 2000	University of Central Lancashire	York Vision	York University
2000	Hullwired	Hull University	unknown	unknown
1999	bloc	Falmouth College of Arts	Scrapie Interactive	Bradford University

=== Reporter of the Year ===
Until 2009 there was a separate category of Student Journalist of the Year which was selected from all categories of the awards. This award was removed from 2010 onwards and awards are now only given in specific categories of entry.

Reporter of the Year	Winner	Publication	University	Runner-up	Publication	University
2013	Alisha Rouse		University of Sheffield			
2012	Elizabeth Porter		University of Oxford			
2011	Simon Murphy	The Courier	Newcastle University			
2010	Camilla Turner	Cherwell	University of Oxford			
2009	Michael Stothard	Varsity	University of Cambridge			
2008	Hannah Küchler		University of Oxford	Adam Thorn	York Vision	University of York
2007	Lucy Taylor	York Vision	University of York	Andy Heath	Oxford Student	University of Oxford
2006	Felicity Hay	Sheffield Steel	University of Sheffield	Rupert Neate	Felix	Imperial College London
2005	Roger Waite	Oxford Student	University of Oxford	Jessica Salter	Leeds Student	University of Leeds
2004	Ruaridh Arrow	Glasgow University Guardian	University of Glasgow	Stewart MacLean	Student Direct	University of Manchester
2003	Robert Harris	York Vision	University of York	-	-	-
2002	Jonathan Colman	Scan	Lancaster University	-	-	-
2001	Alice Tarleton	The Steel Press	University of Sheffield	Steve Bloomfield	Liverpool Student	University of Liverpool
2000	Guy Adams	The Steel Press	Sheffield University	unknown	unknown	unknown
1999	Guy Adams	The Steel Press	Sheffield University	Richard Colebourn	Cherwell	Oxford
1999				John Hopkins	The Saint	University of St Andrews

=== Journalist of the Year (now defunct) ===
Reporter of the Year	Winner	Publication	University	Runner-up	Publication	University
2009	Michael Stothard	Varsity	University of Cambridge			
2008	Hannah Küchler		University of Oxford	Adam Thorn	York Vision	University of York
2007	Lucy Taylor	York Vision	University of York	Andy Heath	Oxford Student	University of Oxford
2006	Felicity Hay	Sheffield Steel	University of Sheffield	Rupert Neate	Felix	Imperial College London
2005	Roger Waite	Oxford Student	University of Oxford	Jessica Salter	Leeds Student	University of Leeds
2004	Jon Bentham	York Vision	University of York	-	-	-
2003	Robert Harris	York Vision	University of York	-	-	-
2002	Jonathan Colman	Scan	Lancaster University	-	-	-
2001	Alice Tarleton	The Steel Press	University of Sheffield	Steve Bloomfield	Liverpool Student	University of Liverpool
2000	Guy Adams	The Steel Press	Sheffield University	unknown	unknown	unknown
1999	Guy Adams	The Steel Press	Sheffield University	Richard Colebourn	Cherwell	Oxford
1999				John Hopkins	The Saint	University of St Andrews

=== Feature writer of the Year ===
Feature writer of the Year	Winner	Publication	University	Runner-up	Publication	University
2009	Zing Tsjeng	Varsity	University of Cambridge			
2008	Nicholas Woolf	Nouse	University of York	Chris Watt		Glasgow University
2007	Heidi Blake	Nouse	University of York	Ruth Lewy	Isis	University of Oxford
2006	Matthew Kennard	Leeds Student	University of Leeds	Graeme Allister	Glasgow University Guardian	University of Glasgow
2005	Steve Dinneen	Glasgow University Guardian	University of Glasgow	Zoe Corbyn	Felix	Imperial College London
2004	Thomas Whipple	the Cambridge Student	University of Cambridge	Jon Bentham	York Vision	University of York
2003	Thomas Whipple	the Cambridge Student	University of Cambridge	Clare Bevis	The Oxford Student	University of Oxford
2002	Matt Withers	The Steel Press	Sheffield University	Helen Pidd	The Student	Edinburgh University
2001	Olav Bjortomt	Platform	Nottingham Trent University	Benjamin Secher	Isis Magazine	Oxford University
2000	Adam Blenford	Leeds Student	Leeds University	Polly Curtis	Leeds Student	Leeds University
1999	Merope Mills	Student Direct	University of Manchester	Jemima Sissons	Leeds Student	Leeds University

=== Columnist of the Year ===
Columnist of the Year	Winner	Publication	University	Runner-up	Publication	University
2009	Charlotte Runcie	Varsity	University of Cambridge	Robert Peal	Varsity	University of Cambridge
2008	Harry Byford	Epigram	University of Bristol	Angry Geek	-	Imperial College
2007	Jonathan Liew	Student	University of Edinburgh	Stephen Daisley	Glasgow University Guardian	University of Glasgow
2006	Andrew Mickel	Gair Rhydd	Cardiff University	Rohin Francis	Medical Student Newspaper	St George's, University of London
2005	Jonathan Bray	York Vision	University of York	Daniel Calder	Student Direct	University of Manchester
2005				Peter Cardwell	Oxford Student	University of Oxford
2004	Archie Bland	Varsity	University of Cambridge	Tim Hill	Student Direct	University of Manchester
2003	Ravi Somaiya	Student Direct	University of Manchester	Iain Hollingshead	Varsity	University of Cambridge
2002	Gareth Walker	York Vision	University of York	Amy Franks	Impact	Nottingham University
2001	-	-	-	-	-	-
2000	-	-	-	-	-	-
1999	-	-	-	-	-	-

=== Critic of the Year ===
Critic of the Year	Winner	Publication	University	Runner-up	Publication	University
2009	Catherine Sylvain	Student	University of Edinburgh	Alan Williamson	Student	University of Edinburgh
2008	Leo Robson		Warwick University	Fern Brady	Student	University of Edinburgh
2007	Richard Webb		University of York	Ben Lafferty	Cherwell	Oxford University
2006	Ben Lafferty	Cherwell	Oxford University	Andrew Mickel	gair rhydd	Cardiff University
2005	Laura Battle	The Student	University of Edinburgh	Matt Green	The Badger	University of Sussex
2004	Steve Dinneen	Glasgow University Guardian	University of Glasgow	Alex Boekestyn	Scan	Lancaster University
2003	Steve Pill	Student Direct	University of Manchester	Andrzej Lukowski	Leeds Student	University of Leeds
2002	Oliver Mann	Cherwell	Oxford University	Mark Powell	Leeds Student	Leeds University
2001	Gary Ryan	Student Direct	University of Manchester	Olav Bjortomt	Platform	Nottingham Trent University
2000	John Kelly	-	Edinburgh Trinity University	Catherine Shoard	Cherwell	Oxford
1999	S F Said	Varsity	Cambridge University	Tim Robey	Cherwell	Oxford

=== Photographer of the Year ===
Photographer of the Year	Winner	Publication	University	Runner-up	Publication	University
2008	James Robertson	Student	University of Edinburgh	Michael Carroll	-	London College of Communication, University of the Arts, London
2007	Ahmet Unver	-	University of Brighton	Annemieke Goldswain-Hein	-	University of Brighton
2006	Paul Read	-	Swansea Institute of Higher Education	Katrinka Goldberg/Guy Martin	-	Edinburgh College of Art/University of Wales
2005	Sheila Barry	-	Glasgow School of Art	Lisa Barnard	-	University of Brighton
2004	Esther Teichmann	-	Royal College of Art	Mike Pinches	-	London College of Printing
2003	Ryan Li	Cherwell	University of Oxford	Fiona Campbell	-	London College of Printing
2002	Polly Braden	-	London College of Printing	Christina Nunziata	-	London College of Printing
2001	Olivia Arthur	Cherwell	Oxford University	Alastair Mumford	Westworld	University of West England
2000	Thomas Davey	-	Nottingham University	unknown	unknown	unknown
1999	Ed Alcock	London Student	Queen Mary & Westfield College	Sarah Lee	London Student	University College London
1996	John Norsworthy	The Smoke	University of Westminster	Dominik Tyler	–	–

=== Publication Design of the Year (now defunct) ===
Publication Design of the Year	Winner	University	Runner-up	University
2008	Less Common More Sense	University of the Arts, London	Pulp	Newcastle University
2007	Varsity	University of Cambridge	Smiths	Goldsmiths College, London
2006	Smiths	Goldsmiths College, London	Impact Magazine	University of Nottingham
2005	Smiths	Goldsmiths College, London	Less Common	University of the Arts, London
2004	Soup	Kent Institute of Art & Design	Meat magazine	University of Cambridge
2003	Hardcore is More Than Music	Chelsea College of Art and Design	-	-
2002	The Smoke	University of Westminster	Westworld	University of the West of England
2001	Westworld	University of the West of England	Trinity News	Trinity College Dublin
2000	Pulp	Manchester Metropolitan University	S-Press	Sheffield Hallam University
1999	Shout	Liverpool John Moores University	Bowerhaus	University of the West of England

=== Diversity writer of the Year (now defunct) ===
Diversity writer of the Year	Winner	Publication	University	Runner-up	Publication	University
2008	Daniel Calder		University of Manchester	Hani Mer-Si	Leeds Student	University of Leeds
2007	Heidi Blake	Nouse	University of York	Helen Thompson		Cardiff University
2006	Rohin Francis	Medical Student Newspaper	St George's, University of London	Dan Johnson	Leeds Student	University of Leeds
2005	Sam Richardson	Varsity	University of Cambridge	Pooja Menon	Platform	Nottingham Trent University
2004	Jacob Mukherjee	Nouse	University of York	Katharine Houreld	Massive	City University
2003	Peter Lahiff	College Tribune	University College Dublin	Andrzej Lukowski	Leeds Student	University of Leeds
2002	Paul Gallagher	Leeds Student	Leeds University	Nosheen Asghar	Impact	University of Nottingham
2001	Faisal Al Yafai	The Steel Press	University of Sheffield	Clare Rudebeck	Leeds Student	Leeds University
2000	Faisal Al Yafai	The Steel Press	University of Sheffield	unknown	unknown	unknown
1999	Steve Kilgallon	Cherwell	Oxford University	Editorial team	Leeds Student	Leeds University

=== Travel writer of the Year (now defunct) ===
Travel writer of the Year	Winner	Publication	University	Runner-up	Publication	University
2009	Clyde Macfarlane	Student Direct	Manchester University	Girish Gupta	Student Direct	Manchester University
2008	Stuart Powell		London School of Economics	Will Joce		London School of Economics
2007	Peter Dominiczak		Imperial College	Michael Kielty		University of Cambridge
2006	Tancred Newbury	Warwick Boar	University of Warwick	Silje Boyum	Unknown	University of Sunderland
2005	Robert Castell	Concrete	University of East Anglia	Silje Boyum	Degrees North Magazine	University of Sunderland
2004	Robin Lee	The Student	University of Edinburgh	Richard Kilner	Huddersfield Student	University of Huddersfield
2003	Jon Bentham	York Vision	University of York	Jeremy Lemer	The Cambridge Student	University of Cambridge
2002	Alice Tarleton	The Steel Press	Sheffield University	Murray Garrard	Epigram	Bristol University
2001	David Whitley	The Steel Press	Sheffield University	William Carless	Exepose	Exeter University
2000	Polly Curtis	Leeds Student	Leeds University	unknown	unknown	unknown

=== Sports writer of the Year (now defunct) ===
Sports writer of the Year	Winner	Publication	University	Runner-up	Publication	University
2009	Ben Riley-Smith	Varsity	University of Cambridge	Michael Cox	Epigram	University of Bristol
2008	Luke Benedict	Epigram	University of Bristol	Alex Richman	York Vision	University of York
2007	Matthew Nixon		University of Manchester	Ky Capel		University of Leeds
2006	David O'Kelly	Warwick Boar	University of Warwick	Sophie Pickford		Cambridge University
2005	Simon Osborn	York Vision	University of York	John Donaldson	Glasgow University Magazine	University of Glasgow
2004	Paul Robins	Impact Magazine	University of Nottingham	Sam Richardson	Varsity	University of Cambridge
2003	Will White	The Student	University of Edinburgh	Richard Kimber	The Cambridge Student	University of Cambridge
2002	Nicholas Randall	Cherwell	Oxford University	Rob Preece	The Steel Press	Sheffield University
2001	Mark Hodgkinson	Cherwell	Oxford University	John Brenan	The Steel Press	Sheffield University
2000	James Mythen	The Beaver	London School of Economics	unknown	unknown	unknown
1999	-	-	-	-	-	-

=== Student Campaign (now defunct) ===
Student Campaign	Winner	University	Runner-up	University
2001	Gair Rhydd	Cardiff University	Leeds Student	Leeds University
2000	Richard Thurston & Jared Wilson	Exeter University	Lautaro Vargas	Essex University

=== Magazine of the Year (now defunct) ===
Magazine of the Year	Winner	University	Runner-up	University
2009	The Oxymoron	University of Oxford		
2008	Quench	Cardiff University	I, Science	Imperial College
2007	Nang	Tower Hamlets Summer University	Impact	University of Nottingham
2006	Quench	Cardiff University	I Science/Isis	Imperial College London/University of Oxford
2005	Quench	Cardiff University	Impact	Nottingham University
2004	Isis	University of Oxford	Quench	Cardiff University
2003	Student BMJ	British Medical Journal	Pugwash	University of Portsmouth
2002	Student BMJ	British Medical Journal	Westworld	University of the West of England
2001	Impact	Nottingham University	Nerve	Bournemouth University
2000	Isis	University of Oxford	Clare Market Review	London School of Economics
1999	Pulp	Manchester Metropolitan University	Pugwash	University of Portsmouth

=== Small Budget Publication (now defunct) ===
Small Budget Publication	Winner	University	Runner-up	University
2006	The Cheese Grater	University College London	Unknown	Unknown
2005	Lippy	University of Leeds	Smiths	Goldsmiths College, London
2004	Meat magazine	University of Cambridge	York Vision	University of York
2003	The Best Years of Your Life	Latymer School	Hardcore is More Than Music	Chelsea College of Art & Design
2002	The Best Years of Your Life	Latymer School	Universe	Hertfordshire University
2001	The Saint	St Andrews University	Spoonfed	London College of Fashion
2000	Edinburgh Student	Edinburgh University	unknown	unknown
1999	Pulse	University of Sussex	Monte Express	Southampton University
