= LSE Students' Union =

Student union at the London School of Economics

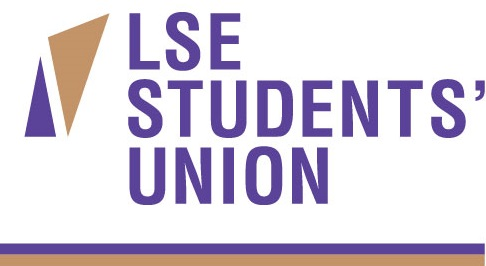
- Institution: London School of Economics
- Location: The Saw Swee Hock Student Centre, London, WC2
- Established: 1897
- General secretary: 2023–24: James Relf
- Sabbatical officers: 2023–24: Joshua Goldman (Education Officer); Chris Adewoye (Activities & Communities Officer); Sarah Onifade (Welfare & Liberation Officer)
- Other officers: 2023–24: Archie Mitchell (Neurodiversity and Disability Officer); 2023–24: Bukky Oseni (Black, Asian and Minority Ethnic Officer); 2023–24: Himani Isyer (Ethics and Sustainability Advisor); 2023–24: Celine Estebe (International Students Advisor); 2023–24: Hannah Gillott (LGBTQ+ Officer); 2023–24: Tanzila Begum (Class Liberation Officer); 2023–24: Tito Molokwu (Women's Officer)
- Members: 9,914
- Affiliations: National Union of Students; National Postgraduate Committee; BUC Sport
- Colours: Purple Azure; Yellow
- Mascot: Felix the Beaver
- Website: lsesu.com

The London School of Economics Students' Union (LSESU) is the primary representative and campaigning body for students at the London School of Economics (LSE). Like other students' unions, it also funds and facilitates student activities of campus, including societies, sports clubs through the Athletics Union (AU), the Media Group, and Raising and Giving (RAG) charitable fundraising initiatives.

The Union is affiliated with the National Union of Students (NUS), as well as being part of the federal Union for University of London students.

== History ==
In 1905, the Students' Union founded the Clare Market Review journal, which ran until 1973 and has since been revived in 2008. The Athletics Union (AU) was created as a constituent body of the Union in the 1940s, and The Beaver newspaper was established in 1947.

=== Activism ===
LSE Students' Union made international headlines in the late 1960s during the well-documented LSE student riots in 1966–67 and 1968–69. In 1967, David Adelstein, president of the Students' Union, and Marshall Bloom, president of the Graduate Students' Association (that then existed as a parallel Union for postgraduates), were suspended from the School for taking part in a protest against the appointment of Walter Adams as Director of the School, in which a porter died of a heart attack. Adams had previously been in Rhodesia and was accused of complicity in the regime's white minority rule. The suspensions were reversed five days later, after students began a hunger strike in opposition to the move.

The Union once again made the news during 1969 for its student activism when students closed the School for three weeks. The protests were again against the appointment of Walter Adams as Director of the School and his installation of security gates at LSE. These initial security gates were removed by students.

On 24 October 1968, Adams, fearing an occupation and growing support by the students for the anti-Vietnam War demonstration on 27 October, decided to close the LSE for the weekend. As this questioned the right of the administration to close LSE against the wishes of lecturers and students, the move led to 3,000 students occupying. During the occupation, the School was policed against intruders, and cleaned; teach-ins and discussions were organised; and medical services were set up and staffed. The occupation ended that Sunday night.

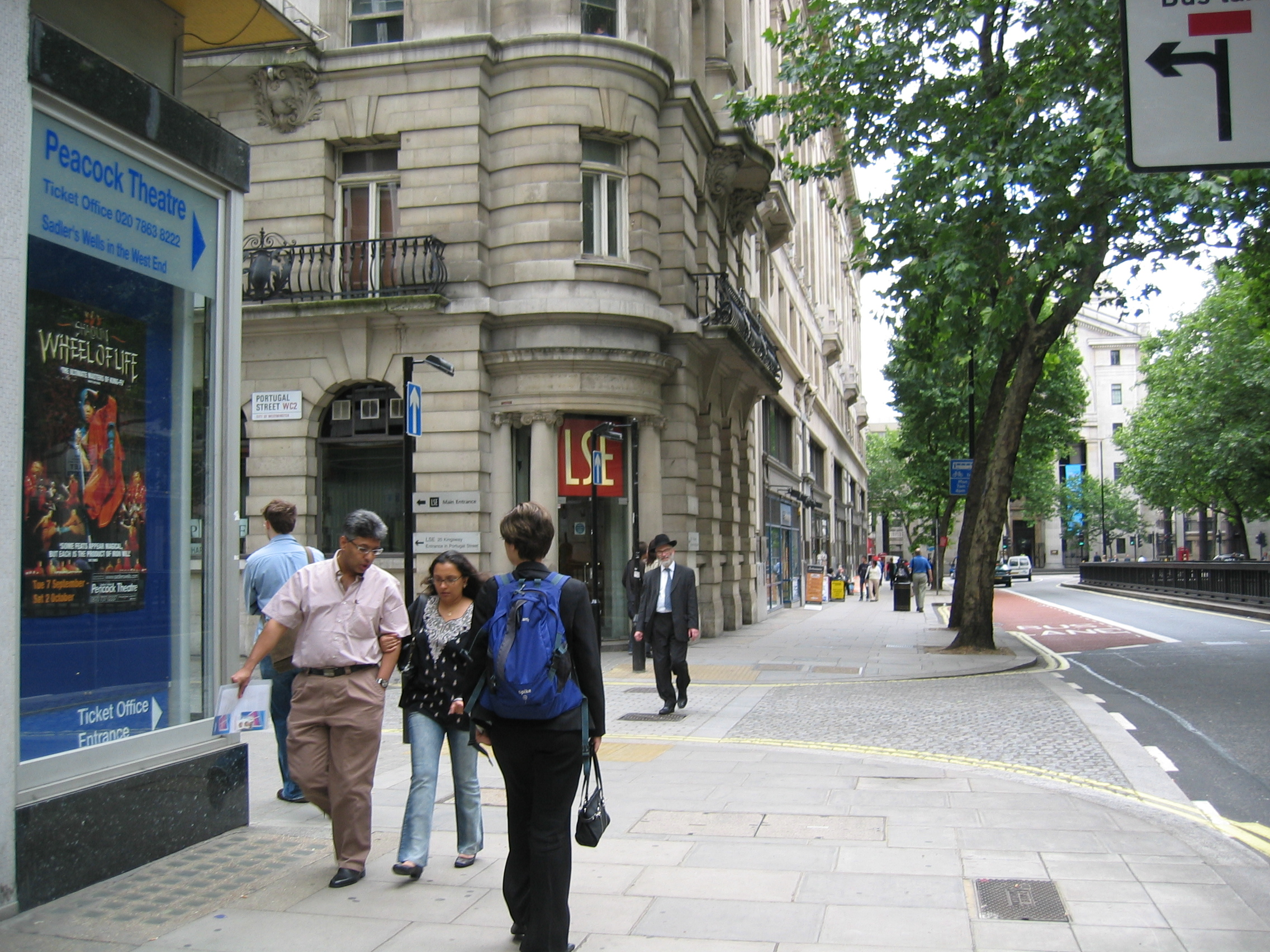
LSE (2009)

In 1969, a "Free LSE" was organised at ULU in response to the suspension of lecturers Robin Blackburn and Nick Bateson. The radical tradition of the Union continued in the 1970s. However, in 1971 there was a reaction against the student activism of the previous 5 years. It was seen as a major swing against the student activism of previous years, but after his term ended the Union returned to its previous status albeit far less activist. The banner of the Students' Union in the early 1980s stated "Arm the workers and students – Education is a right not a privilege". Occupations of LSE occurred throughout the 1980s, including the 1983 occupation to secure the LSE Nursery. The name of the lead officer of the Union was changed from "President" to "General Secretary" during this period. In 1984 the Students' Union passed a resolution supporting the National Union of Mineworkers which included a payment to families of those on strike. The General Secretary, Edward Lucas, resigned claiming that such a payment would be "ultra vires". Following the subsequent by-election, David Jackson succeeded Edward Lucas as General Secretary, declaring "We've won this election after one week's campaigning, these miners have been fighting for their jobs for eight months, now we can give them the support we voted for and they deserve...". The issue was resolved through a benefit concert whose proceeds were donated to miners' families. Meanwhile, Raising and Giving (RAG) Week activities were set up by future New Zealand MP Tim Barnett in the same period.

In 1986, LSE students occupied the Old Building for seven days, to protest against LSE investment in South African companies supporting the apartheid regime, following a decade of earlier such occupations and protests on US campuses. When the riot police attempted to storm the building, the students left immediately en masse without confrontation, marching to South Africa House to protest outside the Embassy, leaving the police at the Old Building in confusion.

In 1989, the Students' Union elected Winston Silcott, one of the Tottenham Three who were originally convicted of the murder of PC Keith Blakelock during the Broadwater Farm riot, as Honorary President as a protest against miscarriages of justice. Silcott was released when the evidence used to convict him was found to be unsafe, but the Students' Unions decision led to national press attention and a large amount of hate mail, including death threats sent to officers, that led then General Secretary Amanda Hart to go into hiding.

In 2005, the Athletic Union's "Barrell" event led to students doing a "fun run" down to King's College London and causing £30,000 of damage to the college's buildings. Historically there is a rivalry between the LSE Students' Union and those at King's College. Students from LSE stopped MP Enoch Powell speaking at Kings by occupying the lecture theatre and blowing whistles, followed by a small section of Kings students retaliating by leading a violent attempt to steal election ballot boxes during the 1983 officer elections.

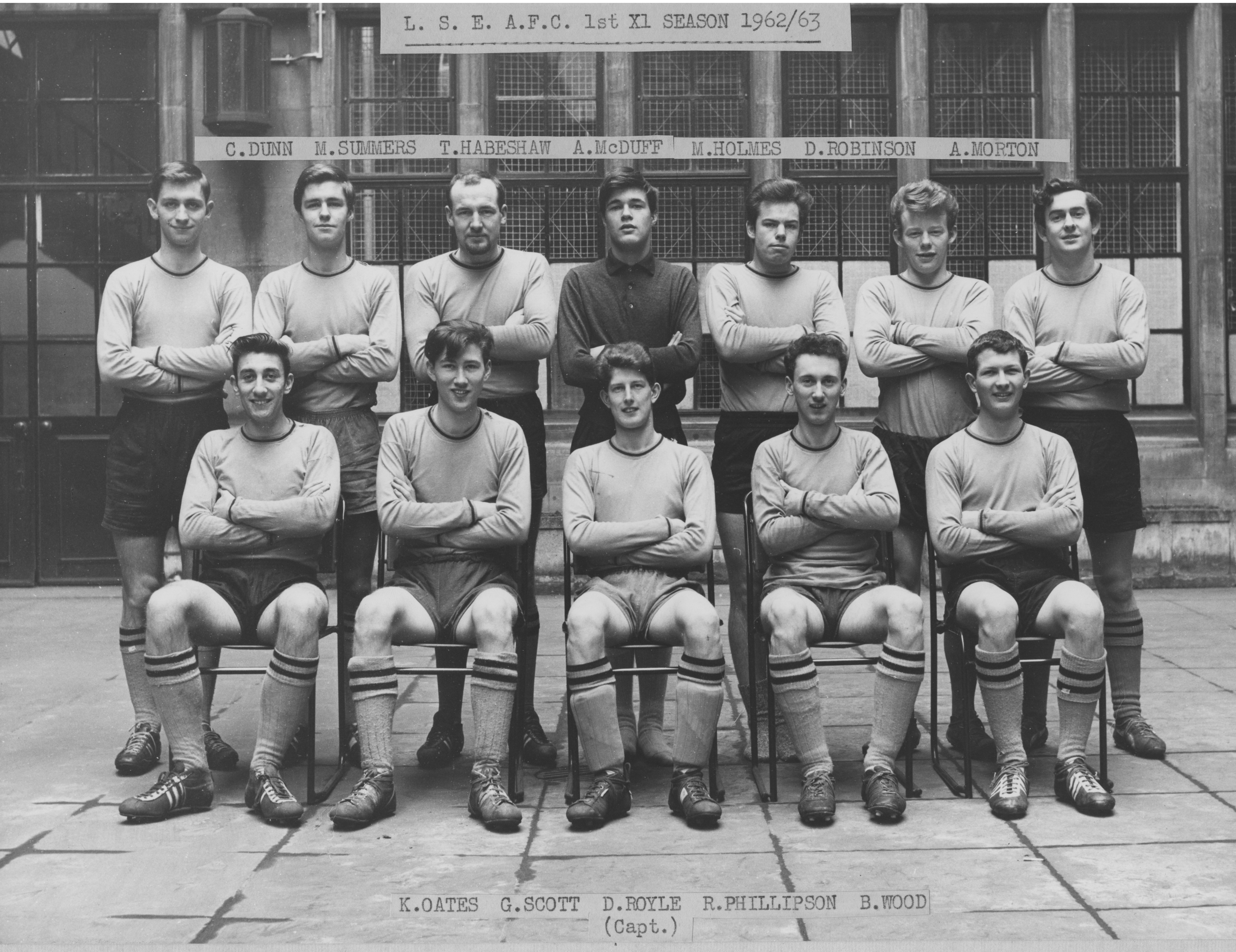
LSE "Old Boys"

In 2015 the Vera Anstey Room in the Old Building was occupied for six weeks by "Occupy LSE", an organisation not officially affiliated with the LSESU, in protest against the perceived neo-liberalisation of LSE and the UK Higher Education system. The occupation ended after nine of their demands were met by the LSE management. In this time they also proclaimed the establishment of "The Free University of London" and noted the depoliticised nature of the LSE campus, including the LSESU.

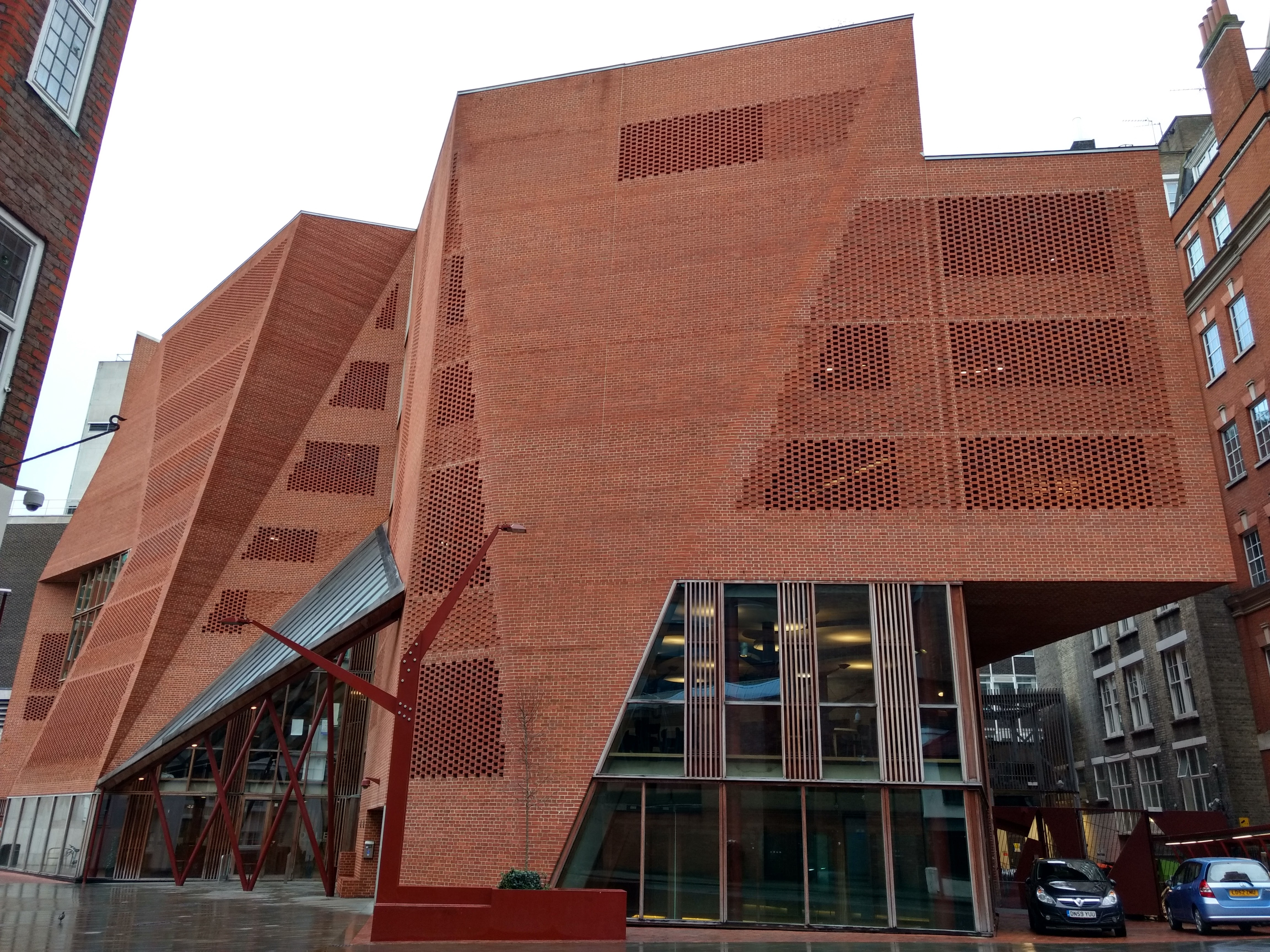
Saw Swee Hock Student Centre building

== Facilities ==
=== Building ===
In 2009, LSE began a £35m project for to build a new building that would house the Students' Union. Known as the Saw Swee Hock Student Centre, it is the second part of LSE's wider estate investment plan, following the opening of the New Academic Building (NAB) in 2008. The centre was the first new structure on the School campus for more than forty years, and aimed to be the "best student building in the world." The building opened in January 2014 and houses the LSE Residences and Careers department. The remaining circa 80% of the new building is Students' Union space, including a 1000-person capacity venue, the Three Tuns bar, gym, aerobics studio, advice centre, media room (with radio booths), sixth-floor roof terrace, Union offices (including Sabbatical Officers'), and two cafés. The cafés do not sell beef for environmental reasons.

=== External sports facilities ===
Off campus, LSE rents a 25-acre (100,000 m^{2}) sport ground, known as Berrylands, in New Malden, Surrey, where the LSESU Athletics Union (AU) sports clubs play.

== Governance ==
The governance of LSESU has changed little in its history, run by a 12-strong directly elected "cabinet", known as the Executive Committee ("Exec") who are also the Trustees of the union.

Four of these positions (General Secretary, Education, Welfare & Community, and Activities & Development) are full-time positions, known as Sabbatical Officers or "Sabbs". These are LSE students who have either completed their degree and elected to stay on another year, or students taking a year out from their studies to fulfil the role. Unusually, the Postgraduate sabbatical officer works part-time, but is paid. A salary of £30,000 per academic session is paid for each of the full-time roles. A fifth position of Postgraduate Officer is part-time and receives two-fifths of the full-time salary. A recent UGM motion capped their salaries after criticism that their pay was too high, however it remains the highest in the country compared to other students' unions. They are paid the average LSE graduates' starting salary. Sabbs hold no more constitutional weight on the Executive than the part-time officers, each holding one vote.

Until 2010, the "Exec" (except AU President and Returning Officer), were all trustees of the LSESU, and legally represented the Union, entering into contracts and representing the organisation in court. These trustees were all individually legally responsible for the Union's activities: they ensure the Union is compliant with legislation, they oversee its financial management, and they prioritise its resources on behalf of all the members.

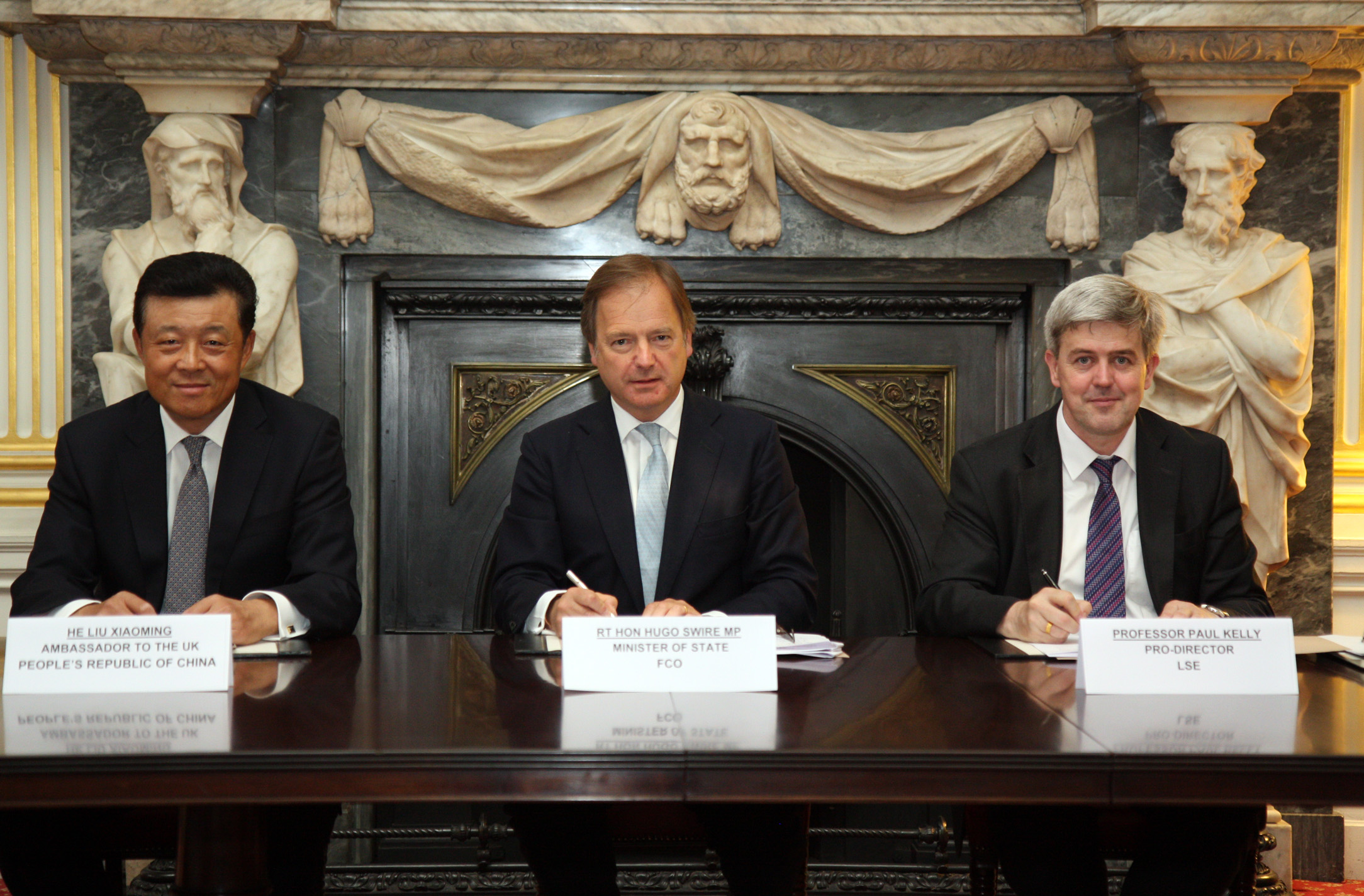
LSE-Chevening Scholarship Agreements

=== Union General Meeting (UGM) ===
The UGM is the sovereign body of the Union, where motions and ideas are discussed and debated. Any two people can move a motion on any subject, which is then debated at the UGM. Regular meetings are also held with the School's Director, and the heads of both ULU and the NUS.

=== Notable Sabbatical Officers ===
- John Moore, Baron Moore of Lower Marsh
- Martin Lewis – General Secretary 1994/5
- Gary Delaney – Entertainments Officer 1994/5

== Recent Campaigns ==
=== Ethics ===
In 2005, the Union campaigned successfully to secure a Living Wage for the cleaners on campus and within the LSE's residences. The campaign was led by students, cleaners, academics and The East London Citizens Organisation (TELCO) and has involved several protests, petitions, motions and lobbying of the School's administration in an effort to lift cleaners out of poverty pay.

In 2006, the Union also voted to divest from fourteen listed arms companies and are currently lobbying the School to do the same. In 2008-9 the priority campaign of the Union was to save the on-campus nursery from closure. In 2009–10 the Union lobbied LSE to allow students to have resits in their examinations.

In protest to LSE's ties to Libya's Gaddafi regime, the Students' Union led demonstrations and occupations, including one of the Director's office. The Union was chiefly responsible for LSE agreeing to convert all £300,000 it had received from Gaddafi into scholarships for Libyan students.

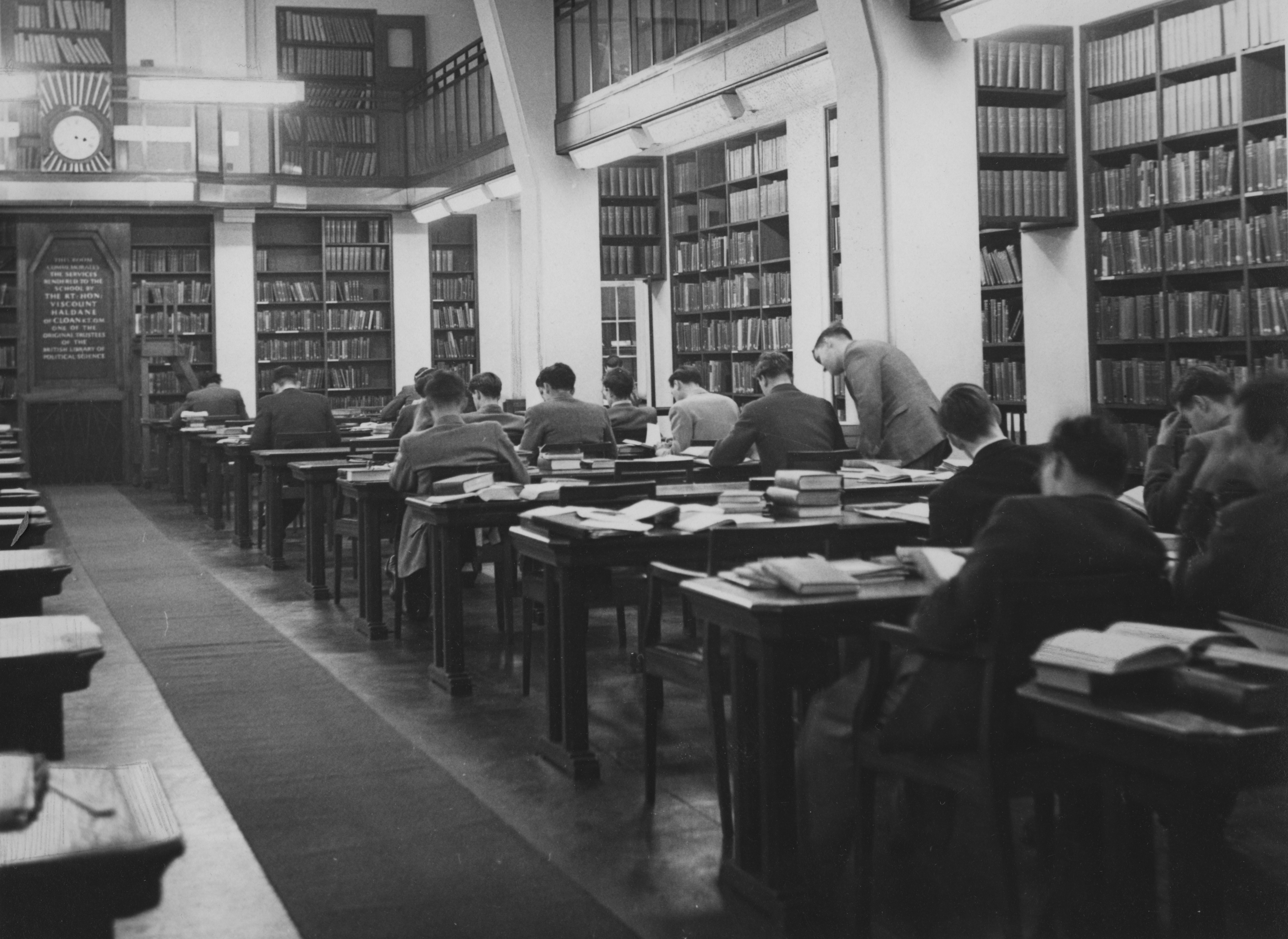
Haldane Room, Old Library (LSE)

Following a motion passed in March 2011, the priority campaign for 2011–12 was The Only Way is Ethics, campaigning for an ethical investment policy after the LSE–Gaddafi affair, as well as a one-person, one vote system for electing a new Director after Howard Davies' resignation.

=== Palestinian Issue ===
The LSE Students' Union, and particularly its Palestine Society, has campaigned in solidarity with Palestine and Palestinian students.

In 2007, the Union voted to twin with An-Najah National University Students' Council in Nablus, Palestine, and to affiliate to the Right to Education Campaign in support of the Palestinian Right to Education. In the same year, LSE students elected as Honorary Vice President Khaled Al-Mudallal, a Bradford University student of Palestinian origin who was detained in Gaza.

In January 2009, a 40-strong occupation of LSE's Old Theatre by the Union's Palestine Society occurred in protest to the Gaza War, as part of a wave of occupations across British universities. LSE students and alums also began a campaign to allow a student, Othman Sakallah, to be able to leave Gaza and continue his studies at the university, which was supported by the Students' Union.

In late 2009, the LSE Students Union passed a resolution to twin with the Islamic University of Gaza and support the Right to Education for students in Gaza. In 2011, the Students' Union successfully ended LSE contracts with Israeli water company Eden Springs.

At the 2014 Annual General Meeting, the Union departed from this line of activism and affiliated to "Save a Child's Heart", an Israeli-based international humanitarian project, whose mission is to improve the quality of paediatric cardiac care for children from developing countries who suffer from heart disease. This was seen as a symbolic move by the Union to recognise the importance of coexistence in the region.

=== Fees and education ===
The 2010–11 priority campaign was to fight against tuition fee increases in a campaign called Freeze the Fees. The Union's mascot was temporarily altered to a penguin. The LSE Students Union was central in the demonstrations against cuts and a trebling of fees in 2010. The campaign at the LSE was named the "strongest organising drive of any campus in two decades" by the leadership of the National Union of Students (NUS). Students went into occupation for 9 days and were profiled on Newsnight, CNN, Sky News and dozens of other news organisations.

The priority campaign for 2012–13 was entitled "Defend Education", with a focus on supporting Graduate Teaching Assistants and improving the feedback that students receive.

== Activities ==
The Activities and Development Officer is responsible for ensuring the running of the Athletics Union, Media Group, Raising and Giving (RAG), and societies.

=== Athletics Union ===
The LSE Athletics Union (LSEAU) is the body responsible for all sporting activity within the university. It is a member of the British Universities and Colleges Sport (BUCS). Sports teams are wide-ranging from football to fencing, squash, badminton, aqua-hoc, polo, ultimate Frisbee and racquets. Particular rivalry is found with King's College London and also University College London. The Union operates the Gym in the Old Building, as well as numerous squash courts, badminton courts, a gymnasium, an indoor basketball court and tennis courts at the School's central London location, with ownership of twenty-five acres of playing fields at Berrylands in south London, easily accessible by train and also by coaches which depart each day.

Students are permitted to use the facilities of other University of London colleges and those at Student Central comprising its own sports halls, courts, multigym and swimming pool. LSE's cricketers use the indoor and outdoor facilities at Lord's Cricket Ground year-round. The LSE has a particularly strong association in rowing and has a boat house situated on the River Thames at Chiswick.

In comparison to the "blues" awarded for sporting excellence at Oxford and Cambridge, London's outstanding athletes are awarded "purples".

=== Media Group ===
==== The Beaver ====
A weekly student newspaper, The Beaver was founded in 1946, and as such is one of the oldest student publications in Britain. It has gained great clout in recent years, investigating campus, national and international issues and stories, including the issue of costly postgraduate degrees, student loans and examination pass rates. It has a weekly readership of approximately 5,000 and is distributed free across campus every Tuesday.

==== Clare Market Review ====
The Clare Market Review, established in 1905, is one of the oldest student journals in the UK. It is an interdisciplinary academic journal run by students, providing a critical and free forum for students and faculty. The Clare Market Review takes its name from the location of the LSE in Clare Market.

==== PuLSE Radio ====
Pulse! Radio is the School's own radio station.

=== Raising and Giving (RAG) ===
Every February, LSESU holds RAG Week, a week of charity fundraising.

== Societies ==
The Union is responsible for supporting and funding student societies ("socs") on campus, of which more than 200 are currently enlisted catering to a wide variety of interests. There are more than 50 national societies. Additionally, there are societies reflecting the School's background and interests including business, investment banking, NGOs and government organisations, arts societies and political societies.

The oldest society at LSE is the Grimshaw Club, which was founded in 1923. It arranges study trips abroad and hosts high-level speakers, ranging from politicians to ambassadors and entrepreneurs. In 2013, it was the centre of a controversy over the BBC Panorama documentary on North Korea, filmed inside the country with LSE students recruited through the society.

=== Business & Investment Group ===
The LSESU Business & Investment Group is the largest and most active society at the LSE with more than 1,000 members. It is widely regarded as the leading finance and business society in Europe, having hosted guests including Ken Griffin, Howard Marks, Jean Salata, Harpreet Kaur, Brian Moynihan and Anil Agarwal. It has its own podcast, LSE Focal Point, which features founders and C-suite executives at world-leading corporations and ventures. It also has a consulting arm, London Strategy Group, an M&A arm, LSE M&A Group, and a student-led investment fund, BIG Capital.

=== Economics Society ===
The Economics Society is the only society officially supported by the Department of Economics. Membership is open to all students of LSE and is at approximately 800.

The Economics Society Amartya Sen Club, founded in 2015, hosts weekly discussions by economists on their research and areas of expertise over complementary food and drink. Unusual for a student-led organisation, it has hosted several recipients of the Nobel Memorial Prize in Economic Sciences, most recently Amartya Sen, Oliver Hart, Eric Maskin, Peter Diamond, Roger Myerson, Paul Milgröm and Joshua Angrist in 2021. It has also attracted high-profile economists in many fields such as Greg Mankiw, Tim Besley, Ha-Joon Chang, Silvana Tenreyro, Oriana Bandiera, Ricardo Reis, Charles Goodhart, Rachel Glennerster, Phillipe Aghion and Jeffery Sachs. Sen Club appears to invite economists with interesting research regardless of their background, however, as graduate students and undergraduates constitute a significant proportion of past speakers.

The Society's flagship event is the annual Economics Symposium which has hosted a multitude of economic thinkers from academia, government research agencies, think-tanks, NGOs, charities and consultancies. Keynote speeches and panel discussions focus on current economic affairs and latest developments in the field of economic research.

The Society organises the annual Economic Policy Competition for undergraduates, attracting 40 teams internationally in 2021. Its counterpart for pre-tertiary students is the Economics Essay Competition, which is held in association with the Centre for Economic Performance and has attracted submissions from more than 30 countries.

The Economics Society publishes Rationale, an annual peer-reviewed student economic research journal, with Houghton Street Press. Rationale was founded in 2007 as an on-campus economics magazine for £1 per issue. Its creation coincided with the 2008 financial crisis when “economic theory, never an area of much consensus, has become more heatedly discussed and debated than at any time in recent memory” according to Charles Hodgson, Rationale's chief editor in 2009 (now assistant professor of economics at Yale University). Rationale was re-launched in 2019 as a working paper series, and became a peer-reviewed student economic research journal in 2020 distributed online.

=== Grimshaw Club ===
Founded in 1923, the Grimshaw Club is one of the oldest and most controversial student societies in the UK. The Grimshaw Club has been described by many as a secret society, however the club has maintained that it is now fully open and transparent. It is affiliated with the Department of International Relations, yet its membership is open to all students of LSE. Every term, the Grimshaw Club hosts a multitude of high-level speakers, politicians, and ambassadors on the LSE campus and organises trips to embassies and other places in and around London. It also organises special Student Delegations for its members to visit and conduct research in hard-to-access places around the world, including Lebanon, Israel/Palestine, Ukraine, Iran, and Serbia. Its members have also represented the society at international conferences in New York, Berlin, and Shanghai. In 1971, the Grimshaw Club, together with F. S. Northedge, co-founded the peer-reviewed Millennium: Journal of International Studies which publishes articles on international relations three times a year. The Grimshaw Club is also one of the founding members of the Politeϊa Community, an international network of student societies which organises annual conferences to debate issues of global governance.

In 2016, the Grimshaw Club brought US Ambassador Matthew Barzun and Sir Lockwood Smith (High Commissioner of New Zealand) to the LSE for a student lecture. However, the society has also had several more controversial figures speak before such as Benazir Bhutto or Chen Yonglin. In March 2013, only a month after North Korea had exerted a new wave of threats and tested some of its nuclear weapons, Grimshaw was caught in a maelstrom over a BBC Panorama documentary on North Korea, filmed inside the DPRK. The 2academic trip2 caused international media attention, because an undercover BBC journalist, accompanied by a film crew, was posing as a doctoral student. There was a heated debate on if this had unreasonably put the students' lives in jeopardy had the reporter been exposed. Whether the LSESU or LSE themselves had sanctioned the reporter going undercover remains unclear. There was also fear of reprisals from North Korean agents, and a discussion on if the Panorama episode should be broadcast at all, which it, eventually, did. In 2007, David Irving had been in negotiations to speak at LSE, before he was invited to speak at the Oxford Union which led to national outcry.

=== German Society ===
The German Society is a student society with an annual membership of approximately 500 members. Through organising various social and cultural events, the German Society promotes an interest in German culture, politics, business and language. Its flagship event is the annual German Symposium, welcoming speakers from Germany's business, political and cultural sphere.

The German Symposium is an annual series of roughly 20 lectures and discussions, has been organised on the campus for the past 16 years. In recent years, it has attracted renowned German personalities of cultural (Charlotte Knobloch, Berthold Kohler, Robert Zollitsch), political (Angela Merkel, Gerhard Schröder, Wolfgang Schäuble, Peer Steinbrück,), sports (Jens Lehmann) and business (Alexander Dibelius, Jürgen Großmann, August Oetker) spheres.

Initiated in 1998 by German LSE students, the Symposium consists of several public speeches and discussion panels examining current issues relevant to Germany and his role in the global arena.

=== Hayek Society ===
The Hayek Society is a student run society established in 1995 with the main aim of promoting and defending libertarian and free market thought on campus. The society was founded in memory of the Austrian economist Friedrich Hayek who taught at the LSE between 1931 and 1950.

In July 2021, an anarchist group affiliated with Class War emerged at the London School of Economics called "LSE Class War", demanding the abolition of the LSESU Hayek Society, a private-school-free LSE and a David Graeber lecture series to commemorate the life of the late academic. The President of the LSESU Hayek Society responding saying they were "totally illegitimate" and have "no affiliation to the Students' Union, no affiliation to the university and they're not an official campaign of the Students' Union".

== Issues ==
=== Atheist, Secularist, and Humanist Society ===
The LSESU threatened members of the LSE Atheist, Secularist and Humanist Student Society with physical expulsion from the 2013 Freshers' Fair for wearing Jesus and Mo T-shirts. A new Jesus and Mo comic was published in response. The students complied with LSESU's demands to cover their shirts under the direct observation of LSE Security. In 2012, the LSESU passed a resolution condemning a similar Jesus and Mo image posted on the Atheist, Secularist and Humanist Student Society's Facebook page, and threatened the group with administrative action. LSESU had had controversies before over the Israel-Palestine conflict with several sit in protests, and a mock Israeli check-point in regards to the defence wall in the West Bank run by LSESU Palestinian Society supporters.

=== 2016 General Secretary election crisis ===
The LSESU Lent term elections witnessed a record number of 2798 votes for the General Secretary position – the highest post in the LSESU. The two running candidates were rejected by the electorate and the position was re-opened for nominations (RON).

Both candidates were accused of breaking several students' union election bye-laws and evidence surfaced indicating that one candidate had expressed anti-semitic sentiments, while the other candidate had been accused of bullying. The dirty campaign tactics on both sides resulted in disillusionment and the emergence of a successful grassroots campaign to "elect" RON. The by-election triggered by this outcome resulted in the election of Busayo Twins to the role of General Secretary for 2016–17.
