= Nouse =

University of York's student newspaper and website

- Typical Nouse front page
- Type: Student newspaper
- Format: Broadsheet
- School: University of York
- Owner: YorkSU
- Founder: Nigel Fountain
- Editor: Thora Sydney Steinsrud
- Founded: 23 November 1964; 61 years ago
- Language: English
- Headquarters: Home Farm, Heslington, York University of York
- Website: nouse.co.uk

Nouse (/ˈnuːz/ NOOZ; Ancient Greek: nous, meaning intellect, or common sense; also the local River Ouse) is a student newspaper and website at the University of York. It is the oldest registered society of, and funded by, the University of York Students' Union. Nouse was founded in 1964 by student Nigel Fountain, some twenty years before its rival York Vision. The newspaper is printed three times in each of the Autumn and Spring terms, and twice in the Summer term, with frequent website updates in between print runs. As of June 2025, Nouse has printed 511 editions.

Unlike many other university newspapers, which have sabbatical editors, Nouse's staff is made up entirely of current students.

It has changed dramatically in outlook and presentation over the years, being known at one point as the Nouse Co-operative or NouseCoop, and presenting itself as a samizdat publication throughout the 1980s. The last edition of the 2006–07 academic year was printed in full-size broadsheet format, but it is now printed in a tabloid size. It nonetheless remains distinguished from its campus rival York Vision in layout and tone.

In the last few years Nouse has become the university's largest media society, picking up multiple nominations and wins in the National Student Journalism Awards and Guardian Student Media Awards. In April 2019, Nouse hosted the Student Publication Association National Conference in York, which featured the organisation's national awards night, and was attended by student journalists from across the United Kingdom and Republic of Ireland. Prominent members of the journalism industry delivered talks over the weekend including Jim Waterson and Owen Jones.

The Borthwick Institute for Archives at the University of York Library has an archive of Nouse editions that stretches back to the first edition, published on 23 November 1964.

== Content ==
The main paper contains sections on news, comment, politics, business, science, and sport.

The "Muse" culture section includes features, columns, arts, fashion, music, film and TV, gaming, travel, and food and drink pages.

The website holds an archive of the printed pieces from 2005, as well as publishing content such as breaking news, sports results, live coverage of campus events and other features not in the print edition.

=== Supplements ===
Through the year Nouse publishes various supplements:

- Freshers' Supplement: A guide to the University of York and the City of York for new students.
- YUSU Elections Supplement: A guide to the candidates and background information for each year's students' union elections.
- Roses Supplement: A guide to the annual sports tournament against Lancaster.
- London Fashion Week Supplement: A guide to the Autumn/Winter Collections at London Fashion Week (LFW). Nouse has been covering LFW since 2011, and in 2013 covered more than 40 shows with a team of ten writers and photographers.

Nouse celebrated their 500th edition on Tuesday 14 June 2022. The print edition was the longest in Nouse's history, running to 56 pages, and included eight extra pages, including interviews with notable University of York alumni and influential thinkers. This edition the final one for the serving Editor-in-Chief, Ed Halford, and the Deputy Editor's, Lucy Cooper.

== Nouse Events ==
In 2012 the paper began Nouse Events, a new events series. Speakers included George Galloway and Jeremy Paxman. In 2013, this became the York Union, which has attracted speakers including Baroness Scotland, Jon Snow, Alastair Campbell, Peter Tatchell, and Mark Lawson. University of York alumnus Peter Hitchens is a regular guest. Editor from October 2018 to June 2019, Joseph Silke, concurrently held the role of York Union President from January 2018 to April 2019.

== Awards ==
Nouse has had continued success in a number of awards, most notably in the Guardian Student Media Awards.

- 2005 Winner – Best Student Newspaper, NUS/Mirror National Student Journalism Awards.
- 2005 Shortlisted – Best Design, NUS/Mirror awards.
- 2005 Runner-up – Best Newspaper, Guardian Student Media Awards.
- 2006 Shortlisted – Best Newspaper, Guardian Student Media Awards.
- 2006 Shortlisted – Best Newspaper, National Student Journalism Awards.
- 2006 Shortlisted – Best Publication Design, Guardian Student Media Awards.
- 2006 Shortlisted – Best Features Writer (Toby Green), NUS Awards.
- 2007 Winner – Student Journalist of the Year (Heidi Blake), Guardian Student Media Awards.
- 2007 Winner – Best Features Writer (Heidi Blake), Guardian Student Media Awards.
- 2007 Winner – Best Diversity Writer (Heidi Blake), Guardian Student Media Awards.
- 2007 Runner-up – Best Website, Guardian Student Media Awards.
- 2008 Runner-up – Best Newspaper, Guardian Student Media Awards.
- 2008 Runner-up – Student Website of the Year, Guardian Student Media Awards.
- 2008 Winner – Best Features Writer (Nicky Woolf), Guardian Student Media Awards.
- 2009 Winner – Best Student Media, NUS Awards.
- 2009 Winner – Best Student Broadcaster (Anna Bucks), NUS Awards.
- 2009 Shortlisted – Student Journalist of the Year (Henry James Foy), NUS Awards.
- 2009 Winner – Best Website, Guardian Student Media Awards.
- 2009 Runner-up – Student Features Writer of the Year (Holly Thomas), Guardian Student Media Awards.
- 2009 Shortlisted – Best Diversity Writer (Liam O'Brien), Guardian Student Media Awards.
- 2009 Shortlisted – Best Sports Journalist (John Halstead), Guardian Student Media Awards.
- 2010 Shortlisted – Best Student Media, NUS Awards.
- 2011 Shortlisted – Best Student Media, NUS Awards.
- 2011 Shortlisted – Best Features Writer (Camilla Apcar), Guardian Student Media Awards.
- 2011 Shortlisted – Best Critic (Tom Killingbeck), Guardian Student Media Awards.
- 2011 Runner-up – Best Columnist (Charlotte-Hogarth Jones), Guardian Student Media Awards.
- 2012 Runner-up – Best Digital Journalist (Jonathon Frost), Guardian Student Media Awards.
- 2012 Runner-up – Student Publication of the Year, Guardian Student Media Awards.
- 2013 Shortlisted – Student Critic of the Year (Alfie Packham), Guardian Student Media Awards
- 2013 Shortlisted – Student Columnist of the Year (Adam Seldon), Guardian Student Media Awards
- 2014 Runner-up – Student Publication of the Year, Guardian Student Media Awards
- 2014 Runner-up – Student Critic of the Year (James Tyas), Guardian Student Media Awards
- 2015 Shortlisted – Student Publication of the Year, Guardian Student Media Awards
- 2015 Winner – Student Critic of the Year (Chris Owen), Guardian Student Media Awards
- 2015 Runner-up – Student Critic of the Year (Alfie Packham), Guardian Student Media Awards
- 2017 Runner-up – Best News Story (Finn Judge), SPA Awards
- 2018 Winner – Best Newspaper Design, SPA Awards
- 2018 Shortlisted – Best Reporter (Oscar Bentley), SPA Awards
- 2018 Shortlisted – Best Sports Coverage, SPA Awards
- 2019 Runner-up – Best Entertainment Piece (Joseph Silke), SPA Awards
- 2019 Shortlisted – Best Entertainment Piece (Andrew Young), SPA Awards
- 2019 Shortlisted – Best Comment Piece (Joseph Silke), SPA Awards
- 2019 Shortlisted – Best Interview (Andrew Young), SPA Awards
- 2019 Shortlisted – Best Newspaper Design, SPA Awards
- 2019 Shortlisted – Best Website, SPA Awards
- 2019 Shortlisted – Best Sports Coverage, SPA Awards
- 2019 Shortlisted – Best News Story (Oscar Bentley), SPA Awards
- 2019 Shortlisted – Billy Dowling-Reid Award for Outstanding Commitment (Emily Taylor), SPA Awards
- 2019 Winner – Best Empowerment (Patrick Walker), SPA Regional (North) Awards
- 2020 Highly Commended – Best Sports Coverage, SPA Awards
- 2021 Highly Commended – Best Publication, SPA Regional (North) Awards
- 2025 Winner - Best Digital, SPA Regional 'North' Awards
- 2025 Winner - Best Specialist Publication (Muse), SPA Regional (North) Awards
- 2025 Winner- Best Journalist (Tom Layton), SPA (Regional (North) Awards
- 2025 Winner - Best Arts and Culture, SPA Awards
- 2025 Winner - Best Lifestyle Piece (Antonia Shipley), SPA Awards
- 2025 Shortlisted - Billy Dowling-Reid Award for Outstanding Commitment (Ellen Morris), SPA Awards

== Notable contributors ==
Former University of York Chancellor, and Director of the FA, Greg Dyke wrote a column for the paper in the early 1970s, "Gryke".

The late Labour MP Tony Banks and the author Anthony Horowitz also wrote for the paper early in its history.

Mail on Sunday columnist Peter Hitchens wrote a comment piece in October 2012.

== Alumni ==
- Founder, Nigel Fountain has had an illustrious career writing for The Guardian, The Daily Telegraph, and many other newspapers and magazines. He has also written a number of books, including Underground: The London Alternative Press.
- Sian James has recently left her role at the Mail on Sunday, after a long and successful career as Features Editor.
- Ex-Muse editor, Elisa Bray is now music editor at The Independent.
- Jamie Merrill is the assistant features editor at The Independent and the iPaper.
- Holly Williams was an arts and features writer for The Independent. and is now a staff writer for WhatsOnStage.com
- Ex-editor, Heidi Blake is an investigative journalist and author, currently the global investigations editor for Buzzfeed. During her time at the Sunday Times Insight Desk, notable scoops included the "Cash for Cameron" scandal.
- Ex-editor Henry Foy is the Brussels Bureau Chief of the Financial Times, after previous postings as the newspaper's Moscow Bureau Chief and Central Europe correspondent.
- Ex-editor Toby Green is Assistant News Editor at The Times.
- Nicholas Woolf is Editor at the New Statesman America.
- Richard Jolly is Senior Football Correspondent at The Independent.
- Dom Smith is a Football Reporter for the Evening Standard.
