= Robert Harris =

Robert or Rob Harris may refer to:

== Entertainment ==
- Robert Harris (painter) (1848–1919), Canadian painter
- Robert Harris (English actor) (1900–1995), English actor
- Robert H. Harris (1911–1981), American actor
- Robert Harris (poet) (1951–1993), Australian poet
- Robert Harris (novelist) (born 1957), British novelist
- Robert A. Harris (born 1945), American film preservationist
- Robert J. Harris (writer) (born 1955), Scottish academic and author
- J. Robert Harris (1925–2000), American composer of the 1967 Spider-Man television series theme
- Rob Harris (musician), guitarist with Jamiroquai and Shuffler

== Politics and law ==
- Robert Harris (Pennsylvania politician) (1768–1851), U.S. congressman from Pennsylvania
- Robert Harris (Utah politician) (died 2005), member of the Utah House of Representatives
- Robert E. Harris (1935–1996) member of the Virginia House of Delegates
- Robert O. Harris (1854–1926), U.S. congressman from Massachusetts
- Robert O. Harris (lawyer) (1929–2007), American labor lawyer
- Robert J. Harris (mayor) (1930–2005), lawyer, professor, and mayor of Ann Arbor, Michigan
- Robert Harris (diplomat) (born 1941), governor of Anguilla
- Robert Edward Harris (1860–1931), Canadian judge in Nova Scotia
- Rob Harris (South Carolina politician) (born 1965), member of the South Carolina House of Representatives
- Robert M. Harris (1850–1927), governor of the Chickasaw Nation

== Religion ==
- Robert Harris (minister) (1581–1658), English Puritan
- Robert Harris (priest) (1764–1862), Anglican priest and educator
- Robert Harris (bishop) (born 1944), bishop of the Roman Catholic Diocese of Saint John, New Brunswick
- Robert L. Harris (1874–1948), American prelate of the Episcopal Church
- R. Laird Harris (1911–2008), American church leader

== Sports ==
- Robert Harris (golfer) (1882–1959), Scottish amateur golfer
- Robert Harris (basketball) (1886–1964), American basketball player and coach
- Robert Harris (American football) (born 1969), former American football player
- Bob Harris (footballer) (Robert Harris, born 1987), Scottish football player
- Rob Harris (referee) (born 1957), English football referee
- Rob Harris (curler) (born 1963), Canadian curler
- Rob Harris (skysurfer) (1966–1995), American skysurfer
- Rob Harris (ice hockey) (born 1953), American ice hockey player
- Robbie Harris (born 1982), South African rugby union player

== Other ==
- Robert Harris (railroad manager) (1830–1894), American railroad president
- Robert Harris (Royal Navy officer, born 1809) (1809–1865), British Royal Navy captain
- Robert Harris (Royal Navy officer, born 1843) (1843–1926), British admiral
- Robert B. Harris (1922–2014), American sailboat designer
- Robert Alton Harris (1953–1992), American murderer
- Robert S. Harris (architect), American architect, civic leader and urbanist
- Robert Wayne Harris (1972–2012), American mass murderer
- Rob Harris (journalist), British sports journalist
- Robert Harris (1888–1935), perpetrator of the 1932 murder of James J. Smith

== See also ==
- Bert Harris (disambiguation)
- Bob Harris (disambiguation)
- Robert Kirby-Harris (born 1952), administrator
- George Harris, 4th Baron Harris (1851–1932), George Robert Canning Harris, British politician and cricketer
