= Pulse Radio =

Pulse Radio or Pulse radio may refer to:

- Pulse! Radio, a student run radio station at the London School of Economics in London, England
- Pulse 1 Radio, an independent FM radio station in West Yorkshire, England
- Pulse 2 Radio, an independent AM radio station in West Yorkshire, England
- Pulse Radio, an HD Radio station produced and broadcast by KMVQ in San Francisco, California
