= Millennium (journal) =

- Discipline: International Relations
- Language: English
- Edited by: Anastasia Barclay, Kazimier Lim, Madita Standke-Erdmann

Publication details
- History: 1971–present
- Publisher: SAGE Publications for the Department of International Relations, London School of Economics
- Frequency: Triannually
- Impact factor: 2.2; 2.6 (5-year impact factor) (2026)

Standard abbreviations
- ISO 4: Millennium

Indexing
- CODEN: MILLFB
- ISSN: 0305-8298 (print); 1477-9021 (web)
- LCCN: 74646097
- OCLC no.: 49341684

Links
- Journal homepage; Online access; Online archive

Millennium: Journal of International Studies is a peer-reviewed academic journal of international relations. It is run by PhD and graduate students from the University of London and is based at the London School of Economics (LSE). Millennium is published by Sage Publications three times a year, in January, June and September.

== History ==
Millennium was established in 1971 by F. S. Northedge and a group of students from the Grimshaw Club. It is based at the LSE Department of International Relations.

== Editorship ==
Millennium has been a student-run journal since its foundation. Postgraduate students at the LSE continue to edit and manage the journal, with a new team editing each volume. Since 2020, PhD students from the wider University of London (UoL) have been able to attend the weekly held editorial board meetings and, since the 2022 elections, PhD students from UoL have been able to run for any of the editorial positions (editor, deputy editor, and reviews article editor) The current editors for Vol. 55 are Anastasia Barclay (Queen Mary University of London), Kazimier Lim (London School of Economics) and Madita Standke-Erdmann (King's College London). It has become common for the journal that at least one out of the three lead editors are doctoral researchers affiliated with an institution outside the LSE IR Department and from a University of London (UoL) institution.

== Abstracting and Indexing ==
Millennium is abstracted and indexed in Current Abstracts, Current Contents/Arts & Humanities, International Bibliography of the Social Sciences, and the Social Sciences Citation Index. According to the Journal Citation Reports, its 2026 two-year impact factor is 2.2, ranking 53 out of 173 journals in the category International Relations . Its 2026 five-year impact factor is 2.6, ranking 44 out of 173 journals, respectively.

== Annual Symposium and Special Issue ==
Every fall, Millennium organises a symposium at the London School of Economics that forms the basis for a special issue, published as each volume's issue 3. The most recent symposium was on After International Relations - Beyond critique: Building the new in the shell of the old and was held from 3 - 4 November 2025.

== The Northedge Essay Competition ==
The Northedge Essay Competition was established in 1986 to commemorate the contribution of the late F. S. Northedge to the creation of Millennium. The winning essay received a cash prize and is considered for publication in the journal. The competition is open to any student who is currently pursuing or has recently completed a degree in International Relations or a related field. The essay may be part of a doctoral research project, an essay or dissertation submitted as part of a graduate degree course, a seminar paper or similar work.
