= Pulse! =

Pulse! may refer to:

- Pulse! (magazine), a former music magazine published by Tower Records in the United States
- Pulse! radio, a student run radio station at the London School of Economics in the United Kingdom
