= Sunday Mail (Scotland) =

Scottish newspaper

- Front page on 10 April 2016, reporting on Scottish figures named in the Panama Papers
- Type: Sunday newspaper (If Christmas Day falls on Sunday, instead of a normal edition a special Christmas edition would be published on Saturday which is Christmas Eve)
- Format: Tabloid
- Owner: Reach plc
- Founded: 1919; 107 years ago
- Political alignment: Social democracy Scottish unionism
- Headquarters: Glasgow, Scotland, UK
- Circulation: 39,783 (as of February 2025)
- Sister newspapers: Daily Record
- ISSN: 0307-5877
- Website: sundaymail.co.uk

The Sunday Mail is a Scottish tabloid newspaper published every Sunday. It is the sister paper of the Daily Record and is owned by Reach plc.

It should not be confused with The Mail on Sunday; the Daily Mail was unable to use the title Sunday Mail when it launched a Sunday edition in 1982 because of the Scottish paper.

== History ==
The paper was founded in Glasgow in 1919. In 1922, Gomer Berry (later 1st Viscount Kemsley) bought the Sunday Mail, its sister paper the Daily Record, and another newspaper, the Glasgow Evening News, for £1 million. He formed a controlling company known as Associated Scottish Newspapers Ltd. Kemsley sold all three papers to the London-based Mirror Group in 1955.

In September 1999, when editor Jim Cassidy was sacked, the paper's circulation was 767,000. Its nearest rival was the Scottish edition of the News of the World which sold around 350,000 copies at that time.

As of December 2016, the Sunday Mail had a circulation of 172,513. This decreased to 166,195 in February 2017, 159,880 in April 2017, 152,892 in July 2017 and 104,608 in March 2020.

On 12 May 2019, the Sunday Mail announced its support for the Scottish Greens in the upcoming EU elections, becoming the first major publication in Scotland to back the party, despite disagreeing with the Greens' pro-independence stance.

=== Digital Archive ===
20th century editions of the paper on British Newspaper Archive. Recent years issues of Pressdisplay.com website.

== Editors ==
1973: Clive Sandground
1981: Endell Laird
1988: Noel Young
1991: Jim Cassidy
1999: Peter Cox
2000: Allan Rennie
2009: Jim Wilson
2016: Brendan McGinty

== Current news and features journalists ==
- Norman Silvester
- Craig McDonald
- John Ferguson (political editor)
- Julie-Anne Barnes
- Heather Greenaway
- Allan Bryce (sports editor)

== Former news and features journalists ==
- Marion Scott
- Charles Lavery
- Andrew Gold
- Angus McLeod (political editor)
- Russell Findlay
- Brian Lironi (political editor)
- John Nairn
- Bill Aitken
- Alex Scotland
- Steve Dinneen
- Jamie Livingstone
- Noreen Barr
- Andy Sannholm
- Suzie Cormack
- Victoria Raimes
- Archie McKay
- Gavin Goodwin
- Nick Hunter (assistant editor)
- John Finlayson

== Former columnists ==
- Alex Scotland
- Elaine C. Smith
- Gerry Hassan
- Gary Keown
- Scott Robinson
- Melanie Reid

== See also ==
- List of newspapers in Scotland
