= National Student Journalism Awards =

The National Student Journalism Awards are an annual UK-wide student journalism competition organised by the National Union of Students of the United Kingdom (NUS).

== History ==
Launched in 1947, the awards were run in association with The Guardian newspaper from 1978 until 1999 (when The Guardian independently launched the Guardian Student Media Awards).

Recent sponsors include The Independent (1999-2002), The Daily Mirror (2003-2005) and The Press Association (2006-).

== Format ==
The Awards are launched in May each year, with a closing date at the beginning of July. Typically students are required to send their best three articles from the past academic year to be critiqued by a panel of senior national journalists. In October, a shortlist of five entrants per category is released. The winners and runners-up in each category are announced at a London ceremony in November.

== 2006 Awards ==
The 2006 winners were:

Best Newspaper: Winner: Sheffield Steel Press, Sheffield University

Runner up: Gair Rhydd, Cardiff University

Best Magazine:

Winner: The Orbital, Royal Holloway, University of London

Runner up: Impact, University of Nottingham

Best Website:

Winner: Durham 21, Durham University

Runner up: Gair Rhydd, Cardiff University

Best Small Budget Publication

Winner: York Vision, University of York

Runner up: Medical Student, University of London Union

Best Further Education Publication:

Winner: Student Eye, Liverpool Community College

Runner up: Scribbles, City of Wolverhampton College

Best Student Reporter:

Winner: Matt Sandy, The Warwick Boar

Runner up: Matthew Kennard, Leeds Student

Best Student Feature Writer:

Winner: Alistair Plumb, The Warwick Boar

Runner up: Kevin Widdop, Leeds Student

Best Student Sports Journalist:

Winner: David O’Kelly, The Warwick Boar

Runner up: Jamie Dear, Cherwell, Oxford University

Best Student Critic:

Winner: Laura Swinton, Durham 21

Runner up: Laura Battle, The Student (Edinburgh)

Best Publication Design:

Winner: Smith’s Magazine, Goldsmith’s College, London

Runner up: Gair Rhydd (Cardiff University)

Diversity Award:

Winner: Chris White, Gair Rhydd (Cardiff University)

Runner up: Perri Lewis, Gair Rhydd (Cardiff University)

Best Student Travel Journalist:

Winner: Lucy Beaumont, Pi Magazine (UCL)

Runner up: Laura Powell, The Core/ Warwick Boar (University of Warwick)

Best Student Photographer:

Winner: Ching Sum Yuen, Warwick Boar

Runner up: James Robertson, The Student (Edinburgh University)

== Redesign ==
2006 was the last year of the awards in their original format. There were no awards in 2007, while in 2008 two categories of Student Publication of the Year and Student Journalist of the Year were included in the new NUS Awards, which recognise a wider variety of student achievement.
