= Clare Market =

Historic area in London, England

Coordinates: 51.5144°N 0.1172°W

Photo from 1901 showing buildings in New Inn Passage, Houghton Street, then called the Clare Market Slum, which was demolished as part of the Kingsway–Aldwych Improvement scheme in 1905.

Clare Market is a historic area in central London located within the parish of St Clement Danes to the west of Lincoln's Inn Fields, between the Strand and Drury Lane, with Vere Street adjoining its western side. It was named after the food market which had been established in Clement's Inn Fields, by John Holles, 2nd Earl of Clare. Much of the area and its landmarks were immortalised by Charles Dickens in The Old Curiosity Shop, The Pickwick Papers, Barnaby Rudge and Sketches by Boz.

The historic district includes large parts of the London School of Economics (LSE) and several academic buildings on the site bear the area's name. The name of the area is also commemorated in the name of the oldest student journal in the UK, the Clare Market Review, which is published by the LSE. The former Director of the LSE, Ralf Dahrendorf, Lord Dahrendorf, chose the official title "Baron Dahrendorf, of Clare Market in the City of Westminster" when he was made a life peer in 1993.

== History ==
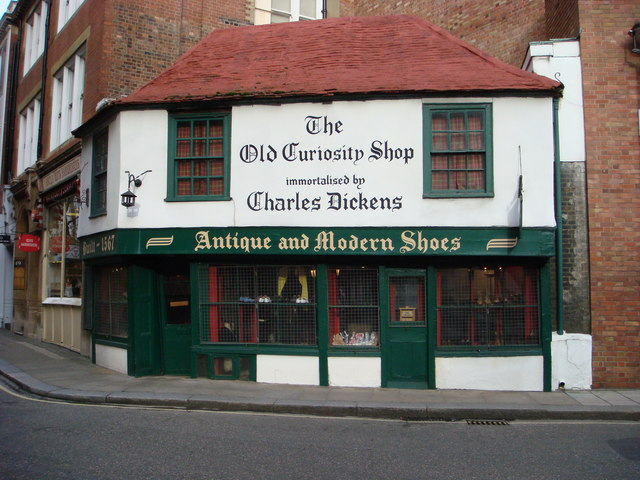
The Old Curiosity Shop in Clare Market claims to be the inspiration for Charles Dickens's description of the eponymous antique shop

Clare Market was originally centred on a small market building constructed by Lord Clare in c. 1657, but the retail area spread through a maze of narrow interconnecting streets lined by butchers' shops and greengrocers. Butchers would slaughter sheep and cattle for sale. An area was set aside for Jews to slaughter kosher meat.

The area was not affected by the Great Fire of London, and the decrepit Elizabethan buildings survived until the area, by then a slum, was redeveloped by the London County Council in around 1905 to create the Aldwych and Kingsway. The market mostly sold meat, although fish and vegetables were also sold. An early theatre was in Gibbon's Tennis Court, in the Clare Market area. A club of artists, including William Hogarth, met at the Bull's Head Tavern in the market.

The market passageway still lives on as a short thoroughfare between LSE buildings.

== London School of Economics ==
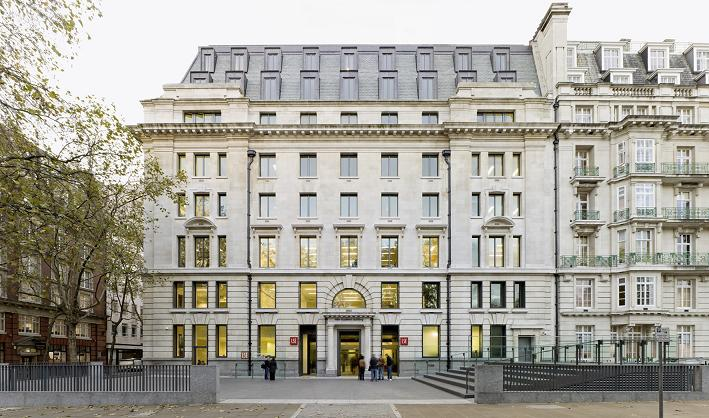
London School of Economics (New Academic Building)

Parts of the London School of Economics now occupy the site, and the name of the area is commemorated in an student-run journal published by the university, titled Clare Market Review, which has evolved into an academic journal for the social sciences.

One former Director of the LSE, Ralf Dahrendorf, chose the official title "Baron Dahrendorf of Clare Market" when he was made a life peer in 1993. This tradition of honouring Clare Market has stuck and become popular over time with LSE alumni. One of the main buildings at the centre of the LSE Campus was called the Clare Market Building, reflecting the school's links to the historic district. However the building was demolished in 2015, replaced by the Centre Building which opened in June 2019. The Royal Courts of Justice and King's College London are also located near the LSE.

== See also ==
- University College London
- University of London
- Covent Garden
- Westminster
