= Bob Harris =

Bob or Bobby Harris may refer to:

== Entertainment ==
- Bob Harris (radio presenter) (born 1946), "Whispering" Bob Harris, British radio and TV presenter
- Bob Harris (sportscaster) (1942–2024), American sports broadcaster
- Bob Harris (musician) (1943–2001), American jazz pianist, keyboardist and arranger
- Bobby Harris (musician), founder of the Dazz Band
- J. Robert Harris (1925–2000), U.S. composer of the 1967 Spider-Man television series theme
- Bob Harris (writer) (born 1963), American political commentator and writer
- Robert S. Harris (programmer), video game programmer
- Robert "Bob" Harris, alias Santo Victor Rigatuso, producer of film Blood Circus (film)

== Sports ==
- Bob Harris (baseball) (1915–1989), American baseball player
- Bob Harris (basketball) (1927–1977), American basketball player
- Bob Harris (footballer) (born 1987), Scottish footballer
- Bob Harris (snooker player) (born 1956)
- Bob Harris (American football) (born 1960), American football player
- Bobby Harris (born 1983), American football player

== Fiction ==
- Bob Harris (character), fictional character in the movie Lost in Translation

== See also ==
- Robert Harris (disambiguation)
