= City Limits (London magazine) =

Magazine in London

- Former editors: John Fordham, Nigel Fountain
- Categories: Arts magazine
- Frequency: Weekly
- Founded: 1981
- Final issue: 1993
- Country: United Kingdom
- Based in: London, England
- Language: English
- ISSN: 0262-2505
- OCLC: 317546106

City Limits magazine was an alternative weekly event listings and arts magazine for London, founded in 1981 by former staff members of the weekly London listings magazine Time Out, after its owner Tony Elliott abandoned running Time Out on its original equal pay principles.

City Limits was edited in its prime by jazz writer John Fordham and former Oz writer Nigel Fountain. The magazine continued to be run as a co-operative for most of its existence, then underwent a chaotic final period of three owners within two years before it finally ceased publication in 1993. Among other journalists, it launched the careers of Melissa Benn, Kim Newman and Suzanne Moore. It was also an early site for the writings of Matt Preston and the art critic Matthew Collings.
