= Felix (newspaper) =

Student newspaper of Imperial College London

- Felix issue 1838, published in January 2024
- Type: Weekly newspaper (academic term)
- Format: Broadsheet
- Owner: Imperial College Union
- Editor: Cristina Carrillo
- Founded: 1949
- Political alignment: None
- Headquarters: Beit Quadrangle, Prince Consort Road, South Kensington, London, SW7 2BB
- ISSN: 0140-0711
- Website: felixonline.co.uk

Felix is the student newspaper of Imperial College London. The newspaper is published weekly during term time with approximately 30 issues per year, and is distributed around the various Imperial College campuses.

The Felix motto, "Keep The Cat Free" (first adopted in 1974), refers to the policy of distributing the newspaper free of charge but more importantly to the tradition of free speech: unlike many students' newspapers Felix is free to criticise union policy whenever the editor sees fit, although during Spring Term 2008 Imperial College Union constitution controversially prevented some news articles from being published.

In addition to news, Felix also carries comic strips, features, opinions, puzzles and reviews, plus reports of trips and Imperial College sporting events. As a student newspaper, it is read by a large proportion of the student body, as well as other members of the Imperial College community. Consequently, it provides an opportunity for advertising to both students and staff.

The editorial offices are located at the Imperial College Union Media Centre in Beit Quad. The editor is elected by members of the students' union as a paid sabbatical officer.

The paper won the Guardian Student Newspaper of the Year award in 2006 and 2008.

== History ==
The publication that preceded Felix in covering student interests was called The Phoenix. In 1886, writer H. G. Wells founded the literary magazine Science Schools Journal, later renamed The Royal College of Science Magazine in 1891 and finally The Phoenix in 1904. The latter continues to be published as the annual Students' Union arts newsletter.

The first issue of Felix was released on 9 December 1949, taking over the duty of reporting college activities from The Phoenix. In 1995, the university established an official newspaper, Reporter, published every three weeks, but this is primarily aimed at academics and staff. In 2005, I, Science, produced in association with Felix, went on to become the first university science magazine to be short-listed for Student magazine of the year in the Guardian Student Media Awards.

=== Cat logo ===
==== Origin ====
Traditionally, a cat has been incorporated into the Felix logo. There have been various iterations, ranging from a cute domestic cat to a roaring tiger. The original appeared as the main image on the cover of the first issue.

==== Replacements ====
The sabre-tooth logo

During the 1980s and 1990s, the most widely used cat logo was the knight. In 1999, this was controversially replaced by a barely recognisable silhouette of a leaping cat (reminiscent of the Puma sportswear logo), then, in 2000, by a scowling pair of human eyes. These changes proved so unpopular among readers that, while running for election, two successive editors promised to "bring the cat back". In 2001, the cat returned in the form of a sabre-tooth tabby cat, designed by the creator of the freakfighter! comic strip. In 2004, the knight was restored, albeit as silhouette since 2006. In February 2008, Felix reported that it was unable to write about everything that affected students due to the constitution of the union. As a result, the logo has been modified so that the cat is now gagged with a red snooker ball.

A change in the cat logo has often accompanied the annual redesign to the newspaper layout, corresponding with a change in the production team.

The academic year starting October 2009 saw the original logo from 1949 reinstated and redesigned to celebrate Felix's 60th anniversary.

== Notable editors ==
- Les Ebdon (1969)
- Pallab Ghosh (1983–1984)
- David Jones (1986–1987)
- Judith Hackney (1987–1988)
- Bill Goodwin (1988–1989)
- David Roberts (1999–2000)
- John Clifford (2000–2001)
- Andrew Sykes (2006–2007)
- Thomas Roberts (2007–2008)
- Jamie John (2023-2024)

== Other sister publications ==
Felix produces sister publications that focus on a wide range of activities at Imperial. The Editor in Chief of Felix is ultimately responsible for the production of the magazines, however, each of them have their own editor and team that work on the layout and content with the Felix Editor present to give a helping hand.

=== I, Science ===
I, Science is a 36-page science magazine published in association with Felix on a tri-annual basis. It was founded in 2005 by Darius Nikbin and is currently on its 32nd issue. Students writing for the magazine are largely drawn from the MSc Science Communication course at Imperial. I, Science was awarded runner-up in the category of Best Magazine at The Guardian's Student Media Awards in both 2006 and 2008.

At the start of 2011, I, Science launched a website, featuring exclusive online content and digital versions of the magazine.

=== Phoenix ===
Phoenix is a publication that preceded Felix in covering student interests [5]. In 1887, writer H. G. Wells founded the literary magazine Science Schools Journal, later renamed The Royal College of Science Magazine in 1891 and finally The Phoenix in 1904.

Phoenix was relaunched and edited by David Paw in 2008, and has since been published termly and has featured a wide range of fiction, short stories, artwork and poetry.

Since 2010, then Felix Editor, Dan Wan returned Phoenix in its original format as an annual, but incorporated into a special issue of Felix in June.

The magazine has since returned to being printed separately, as of 2012.

=== Another Castle ===
New to 2008, Another Castle is the multi-format gaming magazine of Imperial College. Founded by Tom Roberts (2008 Guardian Media Student Journalist of the Year), Azfarul Islam (Felix Games Editor 2007–09) and Michael Cook (Felix Games Editor 2006–07, 2009–10), the magazine is just off A5 format, has up to 56 pages and is also published termly.

In their first issue, they interviewed game developer Peter Molyneux.

=== The Rival ===
Started by Jovan Nedic in 2007 as a pull-out in the newspaper, The Rival is an annual sports magazine that rounds up the performance at the annual Varsity Competition and the JPR Williams Cup, as well as a round up of the season so far. In 2008, it was decided to change it into a glossy A4 magazine.

== Awards ==
Felix won Newspaper of the Year at the Guardian Student Media Awards in 2006 and 2008. The paper's editors also won the Journalist of the Year prize in the same years (Rupert Neate, 2006; Tom Roberts, 2008). Felix writers have also received recognition in the narrower awards categories, with Peter Dominiczak winning Travel Writer of the Year in 2007, Rupert Neate selected as runner-up in the Reporter of the Year category in 2006 and Zoe Corbyn runner-up as Feature Writer of the Year in 2005.

I, Science was runner-up in the Magazine of the Year competition in both 2006 and 2008.
