= Pallab Ghosh =

British journalist (born 1962)

Pallab Kumar Ghosh (born 1962) is a British science journalist. He is a correspondent for BBC News.

== Early life ==
Born in India, he came to the United Kingdom in 1963, attended the Hemel Hempstead School, and studied physics at Imperial College, London between 1980 and 1983 where he was subsequently [1983-84] the editor of the student journal Felix.

== Career ==
He has been a science journalist since 1984. He won the Media Natura Environment Award, BT's Technology Journalist of the Year and The Press Gazette's Science Journalist of the Year.

He has interviewed notable figures including the first man on the Moon, Neil Armstrong; the creator of the World Wide Web, Tim Berners Lee; and cosmologist Stephen Hawking. Ghosh has covered subjects including the Human Genome Project, cloning, stem cell research and genetically modified (GM) crops.

He began his career in the British electronics and computer press before joining New Scientist as the magazine's science news editor. Ghosh joined BBC News in 1989. He worked as a general news producer on BBC Radio 4's The World at One and then went on to become a senior producer on the Today Programme.

As science correspondent, Ghosh has broken several important stories, notably the cloned Dolly the sheep having arthritis, and the abandonment of the construction of a primate research centre by Cambridge University because of fears of attacks from animal rights activists.

=== GM and the BMA ===
In 1993, Ghosh reported that the Science Board of the British Medical Association (BMA) was reviewing the organisation's precautionary approach to GM crops and food. There was particular concern that the Zambian Government had cited the BMA's advice, that health risks could not be ruled out, as part of the reason it had turned away much needed grain shipments during a food shortage. The following year The BMA admitted it had indeed reviewed its stance on GM crops, and decided that new research suggested that GM crops posed no health risk.
