= Bob Greaves =

English journalist and broadcaster

- Born: Robert Morgan Greaves; 28 November 1934; Sale, Cheshire, England, UK
- Died: 14 March 2011 (aged 76); Timperley, Altrincham, Greater Manchester, England, UK
- Occupations: Journalist, television presenter
- Years active: 1964–1999

Robert Morgan Greaves (28 November 1934 – 14 March 2011) was an English journalist and broadcaster, best known as a long-serving reporter, presenter and producer for Granada Television for 35 years.

Bob Greaves was born in Sale, Cheshire and educated at the local Sale Boys' Grammar School, but did not attend university. He began his career working on the local newspaper, the Sale and Stretford Guardian, and later on the Nottingham Evening News, then at the Daily Mail at its Manchester office.

Greaves joined Granada Television in Quay Street, Manchester in 1964 as a reporter and editor for the regional news magazine Scene at 6:30, working alongside the likes of Bill Grundy, Brian Trueman, Michael Parkinson and Mike Scott.

Greaves became a mainstay chief presenter of the station's flagship regional news output, including Newscene, Granada Reports & Granada Tonight for over 30 years and fronted a wide range of local current affairs and features programming, including Scramble, Family Trees, Bob's Century, Time Off and Bob's Hotline. One such regional programme hosted by Greaves, the social action series Reports Action (a Granada Reports spin-off) was transmitted across the ITV network during the early 1980s. He also presented and reported for the Channel 4 series Union World.

Away from his work for Granada, he is also remembered for a clip on It'll Be Alright on the Night involving Greaves and an elephant called Judy while he was presenting a live programme from Chester Zoo in 1981. He retired from Granada Television in 1999.

On 17 January 2008, he appeared on the BBC One daytime programme Wanted Down Under, in which he visited the coastal city of Cairns in Queensland, Australia with his fifth wife, Sonia, a naturopathic counsellor, and contemplated a permanent move there.

Greaves died at home after a long battle with cancer on 14 March 2011, aged 76. His funeral service took place at Timperley Methodist Church on Friday 1 April.
