= Nigel Fountain =

British writer, journalist, editor and broadcaster (born 1944)

- Born: Nigel Christopher Fountain; 1944 (age 81–82); Netley, England
- Education: University of York
- Occupations: Writer, journalist, editor, broadcaster
- Notable work: Underground: The London Alternative Press (1988)

Nigel Christopher Fountain (born 1944) is a British writer, journalist, editor and broadcaster. He has been a contributor to many publications including The Guardian, The Observer, The Sunday Times, New Statesman, The Oldie, Evening Standard, SoHo Weekly News, History Today, New Society, Oz and Time Out.

He is the author of several books, among them Underground: The London Alternative Press (1988), a comprehensive survey of alternative newspapers and magazines. He has also done documentary work for BBC Radio 4 and BBC2 on topics ranging from style magazines and the history of thrillers to dance halls and the events of 1968.

== Background ==
Born in the Hampshire village of Netley, England, Fountain studied Politics at the University of York (1963–1966), and in 1964 he founded the student newspaper Nouse (having already set up a magazine called Eboracum).

In the 1960s and '70s, Fountain contributed widely to magazines and journals of the alternative press such as Oz and Idiot International. In 1981, he was one of 60-plus staff members of Time Out who, after its owner Tony Elliott abandoned the magazine's original co-operative principles, left to establish an alternative listings magazine called City Limits, run on equal pay, with Fountain and John Fordham as co-editors.

Fountain went on to write for other notable national publications. Among these were The Guardian, where he was a commissioning editor of obituaries from 1994 to 2009 (as well as writing many himself), The Observer, The Sunday Times, New Statesman, The Oldie, Evening Standard, SoHo Weekly News, History Today, and New Society.

His first book, a novel called Days Like These, was published in 1985, followed in 1988 by Underground: The London Alternative Press, 1966–74, considered the most comprehensive survey of the alternative newspapers and magazines that flourished in the UK with the emergence of the New Journalism. On the reissue of Underground as an ebook, the reviewer for New Model Journalism wrote: "As a piece of writing, it is a head-long rush, describing the events that shaped the scene as much as the publications itself. As a giddy fast forward through the years in question, at least for the 'turned on' generation who emerged from the rapidly expanding university sector, it is a vivid picture that Fountain paints. He is also good on the social changes that underpinned the scene – the arrival in London of baby boomers from the US and Australia and a cohort of grammar-school boys who were happy to side step the professions. Writing in the mid-1980s, it is perhaps not surprising that the representation of, and work environment experienced by, women in the alternative print was at the front of Fountain’s mind. Two decades on, the sexual revolution that it appeared to embody, in which women were expected to drop their prudish resistance to male demands, is an embarrassment brilliantly unpicked in this book."

In 2002, Fountain won further acclaim with the publication of World War II: The People's Story, about which Publishers Weekly said: "This large and fine illustrated history of WWII through the participants' eyes is far above the conventional nostalgia piece. Personal accounts cover an amazing variety of experiences: the Blitz and the Battle of the Atlantic as seen through children's eyes; Operation Barbarossa from a German tank officer's point of view; the last fight of the Bismarck as seen from the British battleship Rodney; and an Australian soldier fighting the Japanese in the swamps of New Guinea….Even more outstanding is the quantity and quality of the photographs, managing to be comprehensive and comparatively free of overdone chestnuts."

Other titles of which Fountain has been author or editor are Lost Empires: The Phenomenon of Theatres Past, Present & Future (2007), two volumes in the series Voices from the Twentieth Century – Women at War and The Battle of Britain and the Blitz – and the 2014 volume When the Lamps Went Out: From Home Front to Battle Front Reporting the Great War 1914–18.

Fountain features in a chapter of Iain Sinclair's 2009 book Hackney, That Rose-Red Empire: A Confidential Report.

== Bibliography ==
=== Books ===
- Days Like These – novel (1985, ISBN 978-0861047963)
- Underground: The London Alternative Press, 1966–74 (Routledge, 1988, ISBN 978-0415007283)
- (General Editor) WW II – The People's Story (Michael O'Mara/Reader's Digest, 2003, ISBN 978-0888507631)
- Voices from the Twentieth Century: Women at War (Michael O'Mara, 2002, ISBN 978-1854798572)
- Voices from the Twentieth Century: The Battle of Britain and the Blitz (Michael O’Mara, 2002, ISBN 978-1854798565; Reader's Digest, 2003, ISBN 9780762103768)
- Lost Empires: The Phenomenon of Theatres Past, Present & Future (Cassell, 2005)
- Clichés: Avoid Them Like The Plague (Michael O'Mara, 2012, ISBN 978-1843174868)
- The Best Thing Since Sliced Bread: Clichés: What They Mean and Where They Came from (Reader's Digest, 2012, ISBN 978-1606525678)
- (Editor) When the Lamps Went Out: From Home Front to Battle Front Reporting the Great War 1914–18 (Guardian Faber Publishing, 2014, ISBN 978-1783350414)

=== Selected articles ===
- "Colonising Our Minds", International Socialism (1st series), No. 104, January 1978, pp. 24–25.
- "The horror, the horror", Culture, The Guardian, 26 April 1999.
- "Lost in space", Travel, The Guardian, 23 October 1999.
- "A bad day for justice: The Archers", Culture, The Guardian, 4 November 1999.
- "Fjord escort", Travel, The Guardian, 15 January 2000.
- "Perky Sid's soap slip-up", The Guardian.
- "Restricted view: The London Eye is open to all, but what does the city look like from the top of Centrepoint or Canary Wharf?", Travel, The Guardian, 26 February 2000.
- "Riviera reverie", The Guardian, 17 April 2004.
- "The Kaiser's jihad", The Guardian, 27 January 2007.
- "The killing fields: Michael Hodges' AK47 traces how the weapon became the Coca-Cola of small arms", The Guardian, 28 July 2007.
- "Reunited at the grave", The Guardian, 10 November 2007.
- "Time and the river", New Statesman, 3 July 2008.
- "The BBC has been here before", The Guardian, 25 January 2009.
- "A collision of cultures", New Statesman, 21 May 2009.
- "Georgian Dreams: Long before Last Year's Conflict with Russia, Georgia Attracted the Attention of Idealistic Western Politicians and Writers. but, as Nigel Fountain Explains, Their Romantic View of the Caucasus State Was Often Clouded by a Profound Ignorance of Realities", History Today, Vol. 59, No. 9, September 2009.
- "Melanie McFadyean obituary", The Guardian, 23 March 2023.
