= Pulse! Radio =

Radio station of the London School of Economics

Pulse Radio
- London; England
- Frequency: Online

Programming
- Format: Music & Speech

Ownership
- Owner: LSE Students' Union

History
- First air date: 1999

Links
- Website: https://pulseradio.uk/

Pulse Radio is the official radio station of the London School of Economics and Political Science Students' Union. Its studios are located within the Saw Swee Hock Student Centre at the School's Aldwych campus in Westminster, London and it broadcasts online through the Pulse Player, as well as across campus in the Students' Union.

Pulse forms part of the LSESU Media Group alongside The Beaver newspaper, Clare Market Review and LooSE TV.

The station is managed by an elected Executive Committee, which is a subsidiary of the Union, and is headed by the Station Manager. It is staffed by student volunteers who act as Disc jockeys, technicians, and producers, and is funded by the LSESU, advertising revenue, and donations.

The station broadcasts in three slots from October to December January to March and April to June each year, with vacations in between the School's Michaelmas, Lent and Summer Terms. Overnight and during these vacations, the station broadcasts a pre-set playlist which is adapted each week.

== History ==
Pulse began broadcasting on 1 February 1999. For the first few years Pulse broadcast for four-week periods on an FM restricted service licence. Currently the station broadcasts a live stream over the internet and around the London School of Economics campus. Alongside live programming Pulse also produces a number of podcasts during the year.

Membership consists of over 50 DJs playing a mix of mainstream and specialist music, as well as several dozen other students in the areas of promotions and advertising, broadcast journalism, technical, production and programming. In September 2005 Pulse was awarded the 'Student Website of the Year' at the Guardian Student Media Awards 2005.

Starting in 2006, Pulse headed the LSE SU RAG Week with a 118-hour-long live broadcastathon, and along with LooSE TV organised the live broadcasting of the LSE SU election results. This has repeated every year since. The LSE SU Media Group Awards take place in the summer term, jointly organised with the other members of the LSE SU Media Group.

In 2008, Pulse became the first British student radio station to offer a 'listen again' service available through the station's website. Programmes from the past five days are stored online through the 'Pulse Player' at Houghton Street Factual.

== Output ==
In term time Pulse broadcasts live on campus to students every weekday. Additionally, Pulse broadcasts continually online at www.pulselse.co.uk.

During regular broadcast hours, content consists of DJ shows, news, topical shows, interviews and live performances. In the past Pulse has conducted interviews with José Manuel Durão Barroso (President of the European Commission), Jacqui Smith (UK Home Secretary), John Edwards (2004 Democratic US Vice-Presidential Candidate), Clare Short (UK MP), Valéry Giscard d'Estaing (former French President), Kim Campbell (former Canada PM), Jon Snow (Channel 4 Newsreader), Alan Fletcher (Dr Karl Kennedy in the soap Neighbours) and Levi Roots amongst others.

In the 2012/13 broadcast year, The Interview Hour on Pulse has broadcast interviews with: Alan Johnson (Former Home Secretary) Iain Dale (Political Commentator and LBC 97.3 Host) Frank Dikötter (Author of Mao's Great Famine) Frank Turner (Folk/punk musician) Craig Calhoun (Director of LSE)

Outside of the regular programming times, Pulse broadcasts playlists compiled by the Head of Music and Head of Programming of the station.

== Alumni in the media ==
- Former Station Manager, Stacy-Marie Ishmael is now a reporter for the FT and the Editor of FT Tilt.
- Former Technical Manager, Phil Hutchinson is now a BBC Studio Manager working at 5Live and the World Service.
- Former Programme Controller, Alex Baker is now a presenter for GaydarRadio
- Former Deputy Station Manager, Al Smith, is a producer at Global Radio and has presented shows on Xfm
- Former hosts—and 2010 winners of the LSE Media Group's "Best Talk Show"—Danny Gaynor, Thomas Ledwell and Babken DerGrigorian now produce "Political Beats", a renowned internet podcast.
