= John Stathatos =

Greek photographer and writer

John Stathatos (born 1947 in Athens), Greek photographer and writer.

== Biography ==
Based in London, 1970s-1990s, where he studied at the London School of Economics and was Executive Editor of the student newspaper, The Beaver as well as Editor of two issues of Clare Market Review. Active as a poet and freelance photojournalist in the seventies, he published several volumes of poetry in English as well as translations of modern Greek poetry with British small and independent presses. Collaborated with poet and writer Ian Robinson on a number of projects, including Independent Press Distribution and the short-lived magazine Telegram. Journalism led him to cover stories in Kurdistan, the Spanish Sahara and the Philippines for various newspapers, including the Guardian and the Sunday Times.

He later became increasingly involved in photography, exhibiting his work in venues such as The Photographers' Gallery and Camden Arts Centre; alongside his own work, he published reviews and essays on photography and the visual arts in many magazines including Creative Camera, Art Monthly and European Photography, and also became known as a curator. In 1993 he founded Untitled: A review of contemporary art with Mario Flecha, which he edited until 1998.

His writing, criticism and curating have contributed to establishing Greek photography on the international photographic scene. In 1997, he curated the large survey exhibition Image & Icon: The New Greek Photography, 1975-1995 for the Greek Ministry of Culture, and wrote the text for the accompanying 380-page catalogue; exhibition and catalogue represented the first in-depth critical study of contemporary Greek photography, and established the term ‘New Greek Photography’. The exhibition subsequently toured to Britain, Canada, Slovakia and the Czech Republic. His critical writing includes extensive monographs on the Greek photographers Andreas Embirikos, Panayotis Fatseas and Maria Chroussachi, as well as publications and essays on many subjects including photography and landscape and photography and the fantastic.

His principal photographic works include Homage to Melville (1988); Three Heraclitean Elements (1991); The Gardens of the Hesperides (1993); akea (1994); The Book of Lost Cities (1996), which won the ‘Aide au projet’ prize at the Rencontres Internationales Photographiques at Arles in 2004; lumen (2004); lithoi/stones (2006); airs, waters, places (2009) and Change (2012).

On the side, he took part in the world’s last two true intercontinental rallies to be held on open roads. The first of these was the 1974 London-Sahara-Munich World Cup Rally in which he finished, though outside classification. In 1977, he drove in and wrote an account of the 1977 London-Sydney Marathon rally, a 30,000 km competitive drive across Europe, through Turkey, Iran and Afghanistan into the Indian sub-continent before traversing the Malay peninsula and crossing Australia from Perth to Sydney by way of inter alia Alice Springs, Melbourne and Adelaide. With his co-driver, Erling Jensen from Denmark, and driving a Peugeot 504TI bearing entry number 5, he finished in 27th position. The Long Drive was published in 1978 by Pelham Books Ltd, London.

Currently based in Greece, on the island of Kythera, where in 2002 he launched the annual Kythera Photographic Encounters, currently in its 13th edition.
