= Sale Grammar School =

Location
- Marsland Road; Sale, Greater Manchester, M33 3NH; England; 53.418009°N 2.315019°W

Information
- Type: Academy/Grammar School
- Established: 1991
- Department for Education URN: 136498 Tables
- Ofsted: Reports
- Head teacher: Rebecca Smith
- Staff: 100 (approx.)
- Gender: Mixed
- Age: 11 to 18
- Enrolment: 1,260 (approx.) including 315 Sixth Form students
- Houses: Carrington Hall, Deva Hall, Massey Hall, Salix Hall
- Colours: Purple and Silver
- Website: http://www.salegrammar.co.uk/

Sale Grammar School is a grammar school located in Sale to the south of Manchester, England. The school became an Academy Trust Grammar School in 2011. Admission to the school is through its own entrance examination. Trafford LA operates a fully selective secondary education system with grammar and high schools. The most recent Ofsted report rated the school as "outstanding".

== History ==
The school was opened in 1991 by Princess Alexandra following the merger of Sale Boys' Grammar School and Sale Girls' Grammar School on the site of the old girls' school on Marsland Road. The boys' school was on Moss Lane, but since the merger, this site has been converted into a housing development. A pavilion was demolished to make way for the new houses. A second site, the Claremont Centre located near Sale town centre, was formerly used for sixth form teaching.

== Sites ==
The school only has one main site now: the main Marsland Road site. The Sixth Form Claremont Centre used to be the exclusive sixth form area.

=== Marsland Road ===
The main Marsland Road site as it stands today consists of:

  - a three-story Science block
  - a gym
  - assembly hall and stage
  - Seven computer suites
  - the school library with ICT facilities
  - the refectory - the canteen area (which is now 'cashless' through thumb print technology)
  - the Maths/Art block (including media suite with ICT suite)
  - the Technology block (including two workshops, a kitchen classroom, an ICT suite, laptop trolleys, and textile equipment)
  - the English block
  - the Sports Hall
  - an all weather Artificial turf pitch
  - 2 music classrooms and music studios
  - sixth form centre
  - drama studio

The site has extensive fields towards the rear on which two football pitches, a rugby pitch, a running track, and 2 sandpits are situated. Also between the fields and the school buildings is a large concrete area which incorporates a further two sandpits, four dedicated tennis or netball courts, 4 table tennis tables, a basketball court and an area used by pupils to play sports during break and lunch periods.

The school has more than 400 computers with 7 ICT suites available (including a Language Lab). Software on computers is Windows 7

=== Claremont Centre ===
Situated in Sale town centre, a mile from the main site, the Claremont Centre was used exclusively for Sixth Form lessons and for some GCSE language exams, up until Friday 9 May 2014, when Trafford Music Service started to use the facility.

== Notable former pupils ==
=== Sale Boys' Grammar School ===
- Prof Geoffrey Eglinton, Professor of Organic Geochemistry at the University of Bristol from 1973 to 1993
- Brian Fender, former Vice-Chancellor of Keele University from 1985 to 1995 and Chairman of BTG plc from 2003 to 2008
- Bob Greaves, former main presenter of Granada Reports, and presenter/reporter on ITV Granada from 1963 to 1999
- Joe Corrigan, former Goalkeeper of Manchester City F.C. from 1967 to 1983, and England national football team from 1976 to 1982
- Lee Boardman, Actor best known for playing Jez Quigley from 1999 to 2000 in Coronation Street
- Steve Dinneen, journalist for London-based business newspaper City A.M.
- Andy Ashurst, British and Olympic pole vaulter
- Gary Hughes, singer and frontman and main songwriter of hard rock/melodic rock band Ten

=== Sale Girls' Grammar School ===
- Anne Howells, opera singer
- Yvonne Fovargue, Member of parliament for Makerfield
