= The Medical Student =

British medical student newspaper

- The March 2011 front page of "The Medical Student"
- Type: Monthly Newspaper
- Format: Compact
- Editor: Navindi Fernandopulle
- Founded: February 2004
- Headquarters: ULU, London, UK
- Website: http://www.themedicalstudent.co.uk

The Medical Student (TMS) was a monthly print newspaper published entirely by full-time medical students from the five medical schools in London (King's College London School of Medicine and Dentistry, Imperial College School of Medicine, Barts and The London School of Medicine and Dentistry, UCL Medical School, St George's, University of London). TMS was affiliated to London Medgroup, a collective body of Students' Union presidents and British Medical Association representatives from each of the five member medical schools.

It was an editorially independent publication with control over content and editorial appointments vested in the elected Editor-in-Chief and executive committee. TMS regularly published stories concerning medical politics, Modernising Medical Careers, London medical student issues, society, culture and United Hospitals sports news.

It ceased publication in 2016, having moved from physical to online-only publication the previous year.

== History ==
The newspaper was founded in February 2004 by the University of London Union Medical Students Officer, Johann Malawana, as a means to inform London medical students of the key national medical and political issues affecting them, as well as publishing news concerning the five London medical schools. The initial motivation for founding the publication was to inform students of the changes that would ensue as a result of the Modernising Medical Careers policy.

The publication ran into managerial and financial difficulties between 2008 and 2010, and was put on hiatus. In February 2011, TMS was restarted by a newly elected committee.

In January 2015, the paper stopped printing physical copies and became online only.

== Awards ==
- Guardian National Student Media Award for Newspaper of the Year (Nomination, 2007)
- Guardian National Student Media Award for Diversity Writer of the Year (Rohin Francis, Winner, 2006)
- Guardian National Student Media Award for Student Feature Writer of the Year (Rohin Francis, Runner-Up, 2006)
- Guardian National Student Media Award for Student Columnist of the Year (Rohin Francis, Nomination, 2006)
- Daily Mirror/NUS National Student Media Award for Small Budget Publication (Runner-Up, 2006)
- Daily Mirror/NUS National Student Media Award for Small Budget Publication (Winner, 2005)

== Past editors in chief ==
- Navindi Fernandopulle (2016–)
- Rob Cleaver (2014–2016)
- Peter Woodward-Court (2013–2014)
- Katherine Louise Bettany (2012–2013)
- Purvi Patel (2011–2012)
- John Hardie (2010–2011)
- Joanne Ooi (2007–2008)
- Emma-Jane Smith (2006–2007)
- Ferras Alwan (2005–2006)
- Rohin Francis (2004–2005)
- Johann Malawana (2004)

== See also ==
- United Hospitals
- Medgroup
