= The Glasgow Guardian =

Student newspaper of the University of Glasgow

- Glasgow University Guardian front page from March 2009
- Type: Student newspaper
- Format: Compact
- Owner: Glasgow University Students' Representative Council
- Editor: Yvonne Ling and Anna Conway
- Founded: 1932
- Language: English
- Headquarters: MacIntyre Building, University of Glasgow
- Website: glasgowguardian.co.uk

The Glasgow Guardian is the student newspaper of the University of Glasgow.

Founded in 1932 as The Gilmorehill Globe, the newspaper has undergone four name changes in its existence and is the second oldest student newspaper in Scotland. First changed to The Gilmorehill Guardian, then to the Glasgow University Guardian in 1959 under editor Neil MacCormick then to Glasgow Guardian in 2011 and finally to The Glasgow Guardian in 2020. The publication is produced by students of the university on a voluntary basis and is partially funded by the Glasgow University Students' Representative Council alongside revenue from advertising.

== History ==
The paper has reported on sex tourism in Vietnam, racist door policies of Glasgow nightclubs and conducted the first ever independent staff satisfaction survey which revealed doubts about the university management strategy. In 2004 Guardian revealed a CIA officer was working as a lecturer in the Politics department and a year later that Glasgow University Union had been spending part of its grant on a pornography channel subscription, money which had been intended for front line student services. In the same year, it ran an undercover investigation into sub-standard and dangerous student housing, which was described by the editor of The Herald as "campaigning journalism at its best". In 2006, it also reported that university management were rewarding big donors with honorary degrees. The paper has also featured an exclusive interview with former Prime Minister Tony Blair. More recently, the Guardian covered debategate, which hit national media headlines after two female students from Edinburgh and Cambridge were reportedly heckled in a sexist manner by members of the Glasgow University Union. In 2015, it reported that the university's charity fashion show had spent three times as much on an events management company as it donated to charity.

== Awards ==
=== Guardian Student Media Awards ===
- Reporter of the Year: Ruaridh Arrow (2004)
- Feature Writer of the Year: Steve Dinneen (2005), Chris Watt, runner-up (2008), Graeme Allister, runner-up (2006)
- Critic of the Year: Steve Dinneen (2004)
- Columnist of the Year: Stephen Daisley, runner-up (2007)

=== Herald Scottish Student Press Awards ===
- Newspaper of the Year: 2008, 2005
- Best Newspaper design: 2005
- Student Journalist of the Year: Harry Tattersall Smith (2010) Chris Watt (2008), David Crow (2005) Ruaridh Arrow (2004)
- Best News Writer: Chris Watt (2008), Rob Mackie (2006), James Morgan (2004)
- Best Photographer: James Porteous (2008; 2009)
- Best Sports Writer: Harry Tattersall Smith (2010)
- Features Writer: Graeme Allister (2006) Ruaridh Arrow (2004)
- Best Online Journalist: Shaun Murphy (2004)
- Features Writer of the Year: Niamh Flanagan (2024)
- Student News Brand of the Year (2024)

=== Student Publication Association National Awards ===
- Best News Story: 'Glasgow University Charity Fashion Show spent three times as much as it donated to charity' Nathan Stilwell (2016)
- Best Arts or Entertainment Piece: 'The neurotypical gaze in Netflix's Love on the Spectrum' Hailie Pentleton (2020)
- Best Overall Digital Media (2022)
- Best Publication (2024)
- Rising Star (Best Newcomer): Kate Bailey Tonkin (2025)
- Best Arts & Culture Piece Award: 'The art of war photography with David Pratt' Kimberley Mannion (2023)

=== Amnesty International Media Awards ===
- Amy Mackinnon (2012, student),

== Alumni ==
Guardian alumni who have gone on to careers in the media and politics include;

- Donald Dewar, Scotland's first First Minister
- Sir Neil MacCormick, international jurist and former Scottish Member of the European Parliament
- Andrew Neil, the political broadcaster and former editor of The Sunday Times
- Meta Ramsay, Senior MI6 Officer involved in the defection of Oleg Gordievsky'
- John Mullin, former editor of The Independent on Sunday
- Iain Martin, deputy editor of The Sunday Telegraph
- Fraser Nelson, editor of The Spectator
- William Boyd, author and winner of the Whitbread Award and the Somerset Maugham Award
- Steve Dinneen, City AM
- Ruaridh Arrow, Director, How to Start a Revolution
- Robin McKie, science editor, The Observer
