= Steve Dinneen =

British journalist (born 1982)

Steve Dinneen (born Stephen Edward Dinneen, 30 July 1982) is a London-based journalist working for City AM. He is a Lifestyle Editor on the financial newspaper, having previously worked as a chief reporter on Bermuda's Mid-Ocean News and a reporter on Scotland's Sunday Mail.

He was born in Manchester and educated at Sale Grammar School. He was formerly editor of the award-winning Glasgow University Guardian during his studies at the University of Glasgow. He graduated in 2004 with a MA (Hons) degree in philosophy. He was also editor-in-chief of the arts and culture website brazenmagazine.co.uk.

He is the winner of several awards including Feature Writer of the Year at the Regional Press Awards (2026) Young Journalist of the Year (2007). He also received acclaim during his student journalism days, winning Feature Writer of the Year (2005) and Critic of the Year (2004) at the Guardian Student Media Awards.

He wrote articles on broadcasting corruption.
