= Rohin Francis =

British cardiologist and STEMM educator

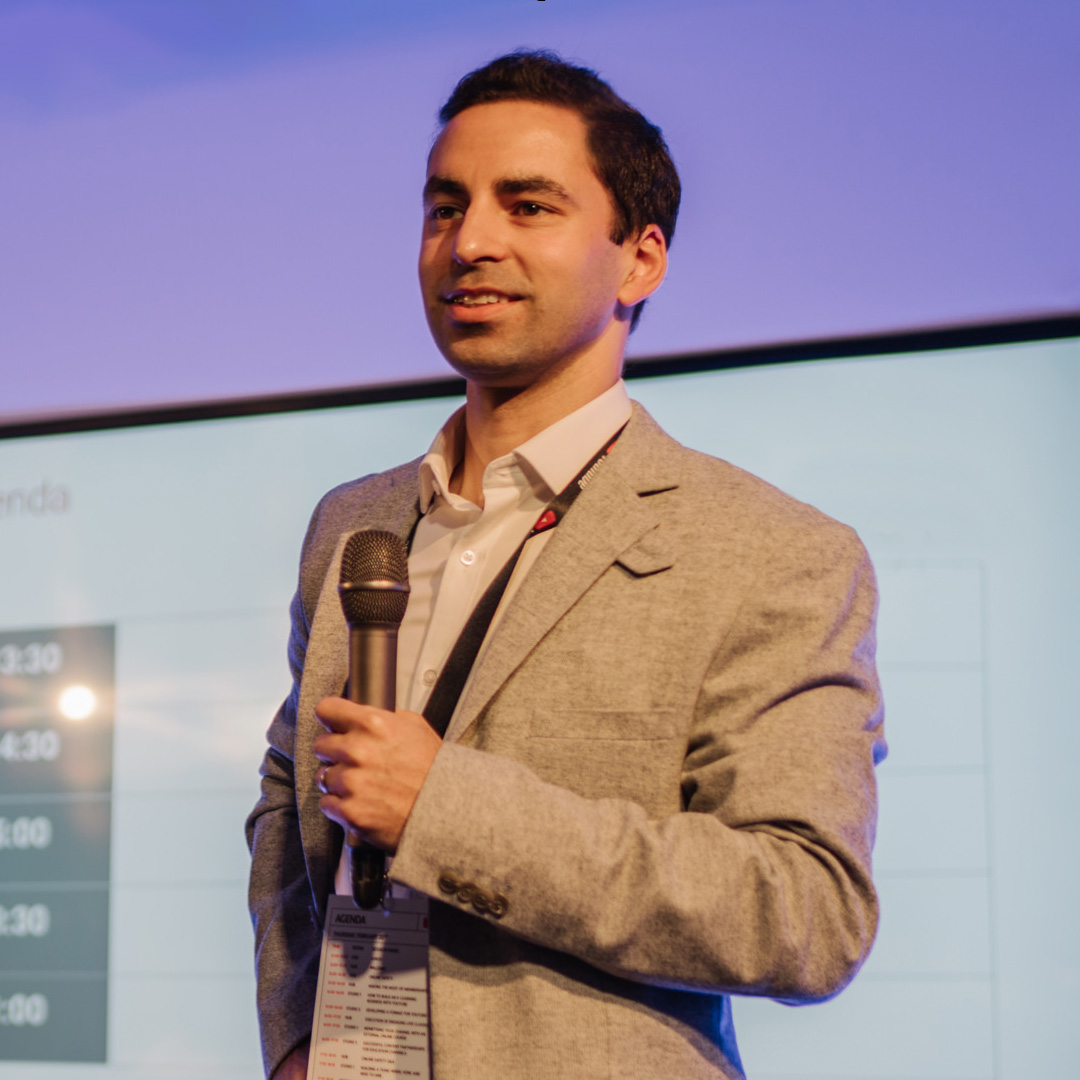
- Francis presenting YouTube Educon in 2020
- Education: St George's University of London MBBS University College London PhD
- Occupation: Cardiologist
- Known for: Social media presence
- Medical career
- Field: Cardiology

YouTube information
- Channel: Medlife Crisis
- Years active: 2017–present
- Genre: Medical education
- Subscribers: 580 thousand
- Views: 50.5 million
- Last updated: 13 March 2026
- Website: www.medlifecrisis.co.uk

Rohin Francis is a British cardiologist, writer and vlogger. He is the creator of the YouTube educational channel Medlife Crisis. He is also working toward a PhD on imaging techniques for acute myocardial infarction.

== Early life and education ==
Francis is of Bengali origin.

He attended medical school at St George's in London, and he trained as a physician at the Cambridge Deanery in Cambridge. He specialises in cardiology.

== Career ==
=== University ===
Francis was a PhD student at University College London, where he studied the use of magnetic resonance imaging (MRI) as a means to image acute myocardial infarction.

In addition to his academic work, Francis is a Consultant Cardiologist at East Suffolk and North Essex NHS Foundation Trust and regularly presents at scientific events; he appeared as a featured speaker at New Scientist Live in 2026 discussing the communication of health information to the public.

=== Science communication ===
Francis is a science communicator with a YouTube channel called Medlife Crisis. During the COVID-19 pandemic, Francis created YouTube videos regarding the virus. In an interview with Men's Health, Francis described why and how people needed to remain positive, whilst acknowledging the seriousness of coronavirus disease. He said that it was appropriate for coronavirus disease-related YouTube videos to be demonetised as it could mitigate the spread of misinformation.

His content ranges from personal life lessons, to deep dives into medical phenomena, and the critical analysis of pseudoscientific practices. While he approaches each topic with scientific rigor and seriousness, he also frequently uses comedy in his content.

Francis appeared on the stage of multiple stand-up comedy shows and his own TEDx Talk, in which he primarily talked about the human body.

==== Public research ====
Francis has argued against the private ownership and licensing of publicly-funded research. He criticised companies such as Elsevier for their high profit margins, earned by licensing primary research. He has also publicly supported Alexandra Elbakyan, the creator of the website Sci-Hub, for her efforts to make research more accessible.

=== Academic publications ===
- Hausenloy DJ, Kharbanda RK, Møller UK, Ramlall M, Aarøe J, Butler R, et al. (19 October 2019). "Effect of remote ischaemic conditioning on clinical outcomes in patients with acute myocardial infarction (CONDI-2/ERIC-PPCI): a single-blind randomised controlled trial". The Lancet. 394 (10207): 1415–1424. doi:10.1016/S0140-6736(19)32039-2. ISSN 0140-6736. PMC 6891239. PMID 31500849.
- Francis R, Lewis C (1 June 2018). "Myocardial biopsy: techniques and indications". Heart. 104 (11): 950–958. doi:10.1136/heartjnl-2017-311382. ISSN 1355-6037. PMID 29032361. S2CID 41152760.
- Kotecha T, Martinez-Naharro A, Treibel TA, Francis R, Nordin S, Abdel-Gadir A, et al. (2018). "Myocardial Edema and Prognosis in Amyloidosis". Journal of the American College of Cardiology. 71 (25): 2919–2931. doi:10.1016/j.jacc.2018.03.536. PMID 29929616. S2CID 49336178.
- Francis R, Kellman P, Kotecha T, Baggiano A, Norrington K, Martinez-Naharro A, et al. (21 November 2017). "Prospective comparison of novel dark blood late gadolinium enhancement with conventional bright blood imaging for the detection of scar". Journal of Cardiovascular Magnetic Resonance. 19 (91): 91. doi:10.1186/s12968-017-0407-x. PMC 5696884. PMID 29162123.

Francis has also written for The Conversation, the journal The Medical Student, and The Guardian.
