= Robert S. Harris (architect) =

American architect, former Dean, civic leader, urbanist

- Title: American architect, former Dean, civic leader, urbanist

Academic work
- Institutions: University of Southern California University of Oregon
- Main interests: urban design, urban architecture and landscape, architecture and place, architecture in context, the architecture of public spaces, elements of the urban landscape

Robert S. Harris, FAIA, was an American architect, professor, dean, and civic leader, and urbanist. His academic leadership at the University of Southern California and the University of Oregon involved 10-year stints as the dean of both architecture programs, as well as chair of the Architecture and Landscape Architecture Departments Programs.

== Early life ==
Robert "Bob" Harris (1935–2023) was born in El Paso, Texas. He was raised by his parents Bella and Jerry Harris alongside his older brother Richard. Harris was married to Sandra Lou Robbins in 1959 and they had three children named Diane, Elaine, and Janet. Following a divorce, Harris later married Elizabeth Vanderzyl. As a young person, Harris showed an early aptitude for drawing and a keen interest in architecture. He obtained a BA degree in architecture from Rice University in 1957 where he was awarded the Hohenthal Scholarship. In 1960, he received an MFA from Princeton University, where he was named a Lowell Palmer Fellow. Harris was elected as the President of the American Institute of Architecture Students during his college years, exhibiting leadership skills at an early age.

== Academic career ==
In 1960, Robert began his academic career at the University of Texas while simultaneously working as a partner in the architectural firm Taniguchi, Shelman and Harris Architects, based in Austin, Texas. He joined the University of Oregon in 1967 as a professor of Architecture and was promoted to Dean of the School of Architecture and Allied Arts in 1971. As Dean, Harris played an active role in campus planning, chairing the Campus Planning Committee and directing a planning process called The Oregon Experiment with Christopher Alexander. This process proposed an incremental design and development approach for campus planning. Harris also chaired the Faculty Senate and Graduate Council and continued to practice architecture, working with Threshold: A Group of Architects, which included Jerry Finrow, David Edrington, John Meadows, and David Winitzk. During his tenure at Oregon, Harris emphasized the connection between the arts and architecture. He was instrumental in the founding of the University of Oregon's Historic Preservation program in 1980, the first of its kind on the West Coast. The Robert S. Harris House, which he designed and built for his family in 1969, is now a designated City of Eugene Landmark for its architectural merit.

== Architecture at USC ==
In 1982 after a 10-year tenure as Dean at Oregon, Bob was recruited to be the Dean of the School of Architecture (SOA) at the University of Southern California in Los Angeles. Bob took over a program in turmoil after the death of Dean A. Quincy Jones. Bob's major challenge at this point was mending fences with the practice community while moving the school from a regional institution to one with an international reputation. The School of Architecture had grown in stature with the emergence of the City of Los Angeles as a global presence. Bob was an extraordinary academic leader and positioned the school between the growing support of the local professional community and the university's desire to become an elite international institution. He built a strong school of architecture at USC that focused on design research and urban design. He cared about the impact of the urban development on people as well as the existing fabric of the city. He also served as Dean during the university's first major fundraising campaign. His personality and his advocacy for "giving back" led to several endowed chairs and funds for major remodeling projects including the library, a school center, a shop and additional office space for faculty.

Architecture was a relatively small program in comparison with business and engineering, but Bob was elected to serve as the chairman of the Council of Deans overseeing the efforts of all 20 schools at USC. In his own school, he introduced new faculty members with interests in research and in urbanism. He was a particularly effective teacher and sought ways to create feedback from studios and seminars that were constructive and helpful to students. He was compassionate and hopeful, and cared about the individual development of students. After 10 years as Dean, he stepped down but immediately took responsibility for building the Graduate Architecture program and a new graduate degree program in Landscape Architecture. He was a popular choice for professional juries, serving on more than a dozen during his academic career. He also authored a number of important articles on urban design techniques and theories.

== Civic Leader ==
As the President of the Urban Design Advisory Coalition and co-chair of the Mayors Design Advisory Committee, Robert continued to work with city officials, guiding the selection of architects for significant civic and arts buildings such as the Disney Concert Hall and the Los Angeles Cathedral. He also served as co-chairman of the Downtown Strategic Plan Advisory Committee, advocating for the densification of downtown and promoting his "density with amenity" mantra, which influenced the development of housing, office towers, civic buildings, landscaped spaces, and a workable public transit system. Harris played a key role in shaping the remarkable centroid that downtown Los Angeles has become.

Harris also actively supported local and national professional organizations such as the American Institute of Architects (AIA) and the Association of Collegiate Schools of Architecture (ACSA), where he served as president in 1972/73. He was a director of the National Architectural Accrediting Board (NAAB) from 1976 to 1980 and a Director of the California Council of the AIA from 1985 to 1987. He was particularly proud of his involvement in the AIA-ACSA Seminars (at Cranbrook) which were attended by professors from the 120 schools of architecture in North America. There he taught academics how to be better and more effective teachers.

== Awards and recognition ==
- Fellowship in the American Institute of Architects, 1985
- ACSA Distinguished Professor, 1985 (the first inaugural cohort)
- Honorary ASLA, 2011
- Council of Landscape Architects Outstanding Educator Award, 2011
- Excellence in Community Planning and Design Award, AIA California Council, 1994
- Excellence in Education Award, AIA California Council, 1993
- Distinguished Achievement Award for Public Service, AIA/Los Angeles, 1991
- Citation, Progressive Architecture 35th Annual Awards Program, Los Angeles Children's Museum, 1988.
- USC Lifetime Achievement Award, 2015
- USC Emeritus Professor, 2014
