= York Vision =

Student newspaper at the University of York, England

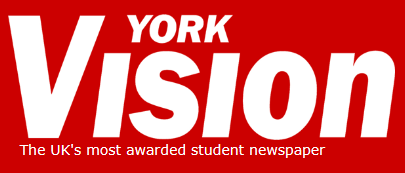
- Mast
- Format: Tabloid
- Owner: York SU
- Editor: Layla Roberts
- Founded: 1987
- Language: English
- Headquarters: Heslington, York
- Website: yorkvision.co.uk

York Vision (previously known as yorkVision and York Student Vision) is one of two student newspapers at the University of York. Vision is a registered society of, and is funded by, the University of York Students' Union (YUSU).

== Organisation ==
Unlike many other university newspapers, which have sabbatical editors, York Vision's staff is made up entirely of current students. The current editors are Layla Roberts and Shahama Anver. The managing sirector is Oliver Ashby.

The newspaper itself contains several sections, with Opinion, Features, Lifestyle, Relationships, Science and Environment, bookended by news and sport. The paper also has an arts and culture supplement called SCENE, which is run separately from the paper's main sections.

== Special features ==
Vision has a number of features that help mould its distinct character. These include SCENE, its arts pull-out containing sections dedicated to Screen, Stage, Music, Literature, Art, Food, Games and Spotlight; the arts and culture features section. The current editor of SCENE is Clara Downes.

== Notable former contributors ==
- Greg Jenner – Horrible Histories comedian
- Rob Harris – Associated Press reporter
- Scott Bryan – television critic

== Controversies ==
In early 2018, The Lemon Press, the University of York's satirical student magazine, accused York Vision of erroneously claiming to be the "most awarded student newspaper" in the country. The outcome of their investigation suggested that the United Kingdom's most awarded student newspaper was The Gryphon, of the University of Leeds. In response, York Vision changed their Twitter description to "one of the most awarded student publications".

The October 2018 issue of York Vision was removed from circulation for a back page advert that consisted of a link to an online submission form, and the heading "Send Nudes". The page received condemnation from the University of York Students' Union, which also claimed that issue had been published without their required approval. The paper was then sanctioned by YUSU and the society was suspended from operating until the start of the 2019/20 academic year under new leadership.
