= Clare Market Review =

Academic journal

- Format: Literary, Artistic and Academic Journal
- Owner: LSE Students' Union
- Editor-in-chief: Udbela Escanero
- Founded: 1905
- Political alignment: Unaligned
- Language: English
- Headquarters: Saw Swee Hock Student Centre, London School of Economics, Sheffield Street, London
- Website: https://theclaremarketreview.co.uk

The Clare Market Review (CMR) is a journal published by the Students' Union of the London School of Economics (LSE). It was established in 1905 and is the oldest student-run journal in the UK.

== History ==
=== Origin ===
From 1905 to 1973, the review provided LSE students with an opportunity to voice their opinions free from the constraints and circumscriptions of university academia. In the summer term of 1972, editor John Stathatos summarized its objectives as follows:

"Its format and content changes to reflect the attitudes of its editors and the vicissitudes of the students' union which publishes it... Clare Market's strength has derived from its lack of insularity and determined freedom of control from both its publishers and the school which stands behind it."

However, financial difficulty and a general decline in interest led to a publishing hiatus from 1973 to 2008. In the Michaelmas term of 1973, the then editor said:

"Clare Market Review disappeared into the darkness of the Students' Union for one session, and it's only now struggling with the pangs of rebirth. Like any student publication, it is hopelessly understaffed - this is a plea for its existence."

Throughout its existence, the CMR has varied enormously in content and tone, sometimes covering a very wide spectrum of subject matter, from literary reviews to analysis of the world's financial markets, and at other times focusing solely on poetry and the arts. Alongside variations in the subject matter, it would appear that the early days of the publication also saw variations in legibility. A 1907 edition of The Economic Journal was pithy in its appraisal:

"It is not easy to find room for improvement in the Clare Market Review, and all may not concur in our wish that the chronicle and reviews were as legible as they are readable, that the character of multum in parvo, which distinguishes the style, had not been made so literally true by the use of type which requires the "microscopic eye" denied to man."

The Clare Market Review has a reputation of being an affectation for those who have been involved with it: in honour of his time spent writing for the CMR and The Beaver, Bernard Levin's name has recently been put to a journalism award run jointly by the LSE and The Times. Karl Popper even had a copy of CMR amongst his personal papers. Beyond simple affection, the Clare Market Review's academic presence remains undiminished and the journal continues to be cited in numerous academic works.

=== Recent history ===
With renewed backing from the Student Union, a group of students re-launched the journal in November 2008. Looking to take influence from previous incarnations of the Review, their stated aim was to "break down the boundaries between academic and thinker, explore critical notions of studenthood, and in the process construct a collective existence for student thought at the LSE and beyond". The relaunch issue (Volume CIV, Issue 1) included contributions from, amongst others, Norman Birnbaum, Roger McGough, and Brian Patten.

In 2012-2013, Aleona Krechetova was Editor-in-Chief.

In 2013-2014 (Volume CIX), under the Editorship of Annie May Leonard and a team including Edward Bayes, Malvika Jaganmohan, Jade Jackman and Lauren Woon, three issues were produced titled 'Family' (2013), 'Utopia' (2014) and 'From Cradle to Grave' (2014). 'Utopia' included pieces by human rights barrister Professor Conor Gearty and anthropologist Dr Jason Hickel as well as a selection of LSE students. 'From Cradle to Crave' was guest edited by Edward Bayes. The contributions to Volume CIX included academia, satire, creative writing, poetry and visual arts.

The journal was once again re-launched in the 2014–2015 academic year. With the advent of social media and online media platforms, the relaunch aimed to increase the journal's relevancy. In this frame of mind, the online edition of the journal was launched, with all submissions available for digital viewing. The relaunch included not just the establishment of an online edition, but extended to include a complete rebranding and restructuring of the journal and its staff. The relaunch proved a success, with high uptake figures for the relaunch issue, titled Tribute (Volume CX).

After remaining dormant for two years, the journal was relaunched in 2017 under the editorial team of Nash Croker, Rosalie Van Onzenoort, Sarah Comiskey and Sam Firman. The theme for the relaunch issue was 'Metropolis'.

For the 2018/19 academic year, the journal began publishing triannually under editor-in-chief Rosalie Van Onzenoort.

Publishing of the journal continued under editor-in-chief Rhydian Rolant Cleaver from 2020, moving the publication of the 'Nostalgia' issue to an online format in response to the closure of the school amidst the COVID-19 pandemic.

In 2021-2022, Michi Kang was Editor-in-Chief of the journal. She had previously contributed to the 2019 issue ‘Maximalism’ and the 2020 issue ‘Nostalgia’ as an editor and proofreader. During her tenure, the journal produced the 2021 issue ‘Catharsis’.

For the 2022/23 academic year, the journal continued under editor-in-chief Udbela Escanero, publishing the issue 'Discovery & Movement' in a digital format and print format.
