= F. S. Northedge =

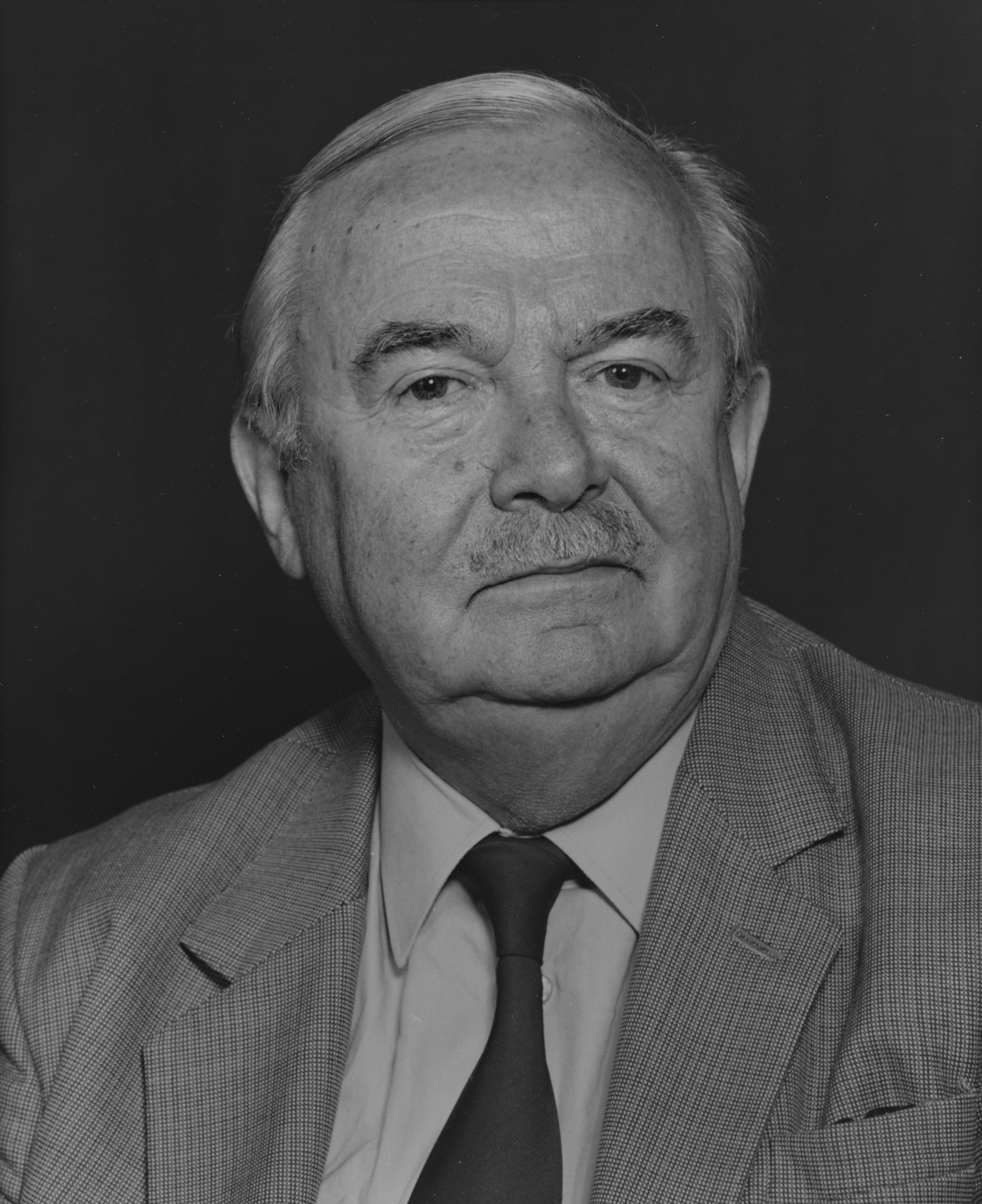
F. S. Northedge

Frederick Samuel Northedge (16 October 1918 – 3 March 1985) was a British Professor of International Relations at the London School of Economics.

== Early life and education ==
He attended Bemrose Grammar School in Derby. Northedge then read classics at Merton College, Oxford, before moving on to study international relations at the London School of Economics.

== Personal life ==
The Northedge Essay Competition was established in 1986 to recognize Professor Northedge's contribution to the creation of the journal Millennium.

== Selected publications ==
- The troubled giant; Britain among the great powers, 1916-1939 online
- Foreign Policies of the Powers (London: Faber and Faber, 1968) online
- A hundred years of international relations with M.J. Grieve, (1971) online
- Descent from Power: British Foreign Policy, 1945-1973 (London: Allen & Unwin, 1974) online
- The International Political System (London: Faber, 1976)
- Britain and Soviet Communism: The Impact of Revolution (London: Macmillan Press, 1982)
- The League of Nations: Its Life and Times, 1920-1946 (New York: Holmes and Meier, 1986)
