= Rob Harris (journalist) =

British sport journalist

- Education: Manchester Grammar School
- Alma mater: University of York
- Occupation: Sports Journalist
- Years active: 2004–present
- Employer: Associated Press

Rob Harris is a British sports journalist for Sky News. He used to work for the Associated Press. He has appeared on MSNBC, BBC and Sky News.

== Career ==
Harris joined Sky News in 2022 as a Sports Correspondent. Prior to this, Harris worked for the Associated Press as a global sports writer. In 2015, while covering the FIFA arrests in Zurich, Harris captured the only video of former FIFA officials being taken into custody by law enforcement at the Baur au Lac Hotel. He has often appeared as an analyst on Sky News, BBC News, CBC News, Al-Jazeera, Al-Arabiya and APTN.
