= The Beaver (newspaper) =

London School of Economics student newspaper

Coordinates: 51°30′49.90″N 0°06′58.77″W

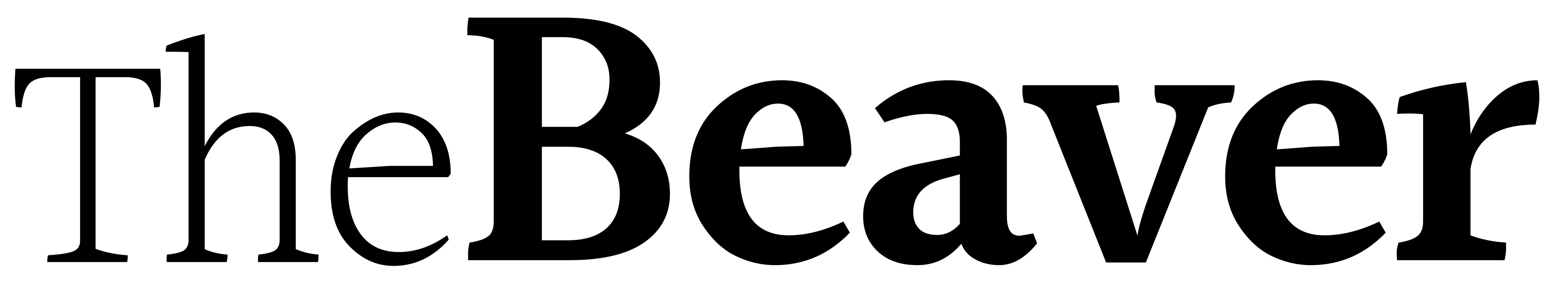
- Type: Weekly student newspaper
- Format: Broadsheet
- Publisher: LSE Students' Union
- Founded: 1949
- Political alignment: Unaligned
- Language: English
- Headquarters: Saw Swee Hock Student Centre, London School of Economics, Sheffield Street, London
- Circulation: 1,000 in print
- Website: thebeaverlse.co.uk

The Beaver is the fortnightly newspaper of the LSE Students' Union at the London School of Economics, England.

The Beaver has had some of its stories being picked up by the national press. One thousand copies are published and distributed around campus every other Tuesday during term time. Articles are also published online daily. The Beaver is governed by its society which is free for any LSE student to join. The paper is made up of sections News, Opinion and Features in addition to its magazine Flipside. The Beaver also produces Beaver Sound, a multimedia podcast platform.

== History ==
Named after the school's mascot, the beaver, which was chosen "as representing an industrious animal with social habits", The Beaver newspaper was first published in its recognised format on 5 May 1949, and is one of the oldest student newspapers in the UK. The British Library of Political and Economic Science holds print and digital archives of the paper dating back to this first issue, which was christened by George Bernard Shaw, one of the LSE's founders. Since then it has gone through several makeovers, survived LSE's turbulent history and emerged to be one of the most respected and widely read student newspapers in the UK.

== News ==
The Beaver's news section has consistently been among the strongest in UK student media, consisting of LSE, University of London and Higher Education stories from across Britain, sometimes being quoted in the national press, including The Guardian and The Telegraph.

== Opinion ==
Opinion publishes pieces discussing issues that are relevant to the LSE community, political analysis, social commentary, and debate. The extensive range of articles and letters featured reflects the broad readership of the paper. Contributions to the Comment section have been wide-ranging and varied, from former LSE Director Sir Howard Davies to lay students. The name of the section was changed from Comment to Opinion in 2020.

== Features ==
The Features section of the paper deals with international relations, politics and strategic affairs. Interviews are a quintessential part of the section, and previous interviews conducted by Taryana Odayar have been with Economics Nobel Prize winner Amartya Sen; ministers such as Marcelo Neri, the former Brazilian Minister of Strategic Affairs; North Korean defector Hyeonseo Lee; Dr Mattia Romani, Managing Director for Country and Sector Economics at the European Bank for Reconstruction and Development; and academics such as German Historian Sonke Neitzel. Other prominent interviewees have been Sir Nicholas Stern and Queen Noor of Jordan, and Ambassadors such as the Lithuanian Ambassador to the UK. In 2019, the Features section interviewed Alastair Campbell, former communications director to UK Prime Minister Tony Blair.

== Flipside ==
Launched in 2018, Flipside encapsulates all the magazine sections of the Beaver. The primary feature of Flipside is a fortnightly interview featuring one or more prominent members of the LSE community. It also features sections which previously belonged to The Beaver – Sport and Part B – and created the new sections Social and Review. The name Flipside is a reference to the fact that relative to the other sections of the paper it is printed upside down which requires the user to flip the paper around to read it.

== Beaver Sound ==
The Beaver Sound is the newspaper's new multimedia podcast platform for news since 2019. The platform features series such as LSE Limelight, Crossing the Globe, Grimshaw Speakers, Guftagu (in collaboration with LSESU Pakistan Society), The LSE Starter Pack, and We Know The End.

== Notable former contributors ==
- Richard Bacon - former Executive Editor; Conservative Member of Parliament for Norfolk South from 2001 - 2024.
- James Corbett - former political editor; now contributing editor of The Observer Sport Monthly and author of Everton: The School of Science and England Expects
- Ekow Eshun - edited both Features and Arts; now the Artistic Director of the Institute of Contemporary Arts, and a contributor to BBC2's Newsnight Review
- Simon Gardiner - former AU Treasurer; now prominent philanthropist
- Simon Garfield - former Executive Editor; now journalist and author of Mauve and Our Hidden Lives
- Stephen F. Kelly - contributor, then producer Granada Television, now author and broadcaster
- Paul Klebnikov - former editor; first editor of Forbes' Russian edition
- Bernard Levin - early contributor to the newspaper, particularly of theatre reviews
- John Stathatos - former executive editor; photographer, writer and art critic whose publications include The Book of Lost Cities and A Vindication of Tlon: Photography & the Fantastic
