= Jeremy Hunt as Health Secretary =

UK Government appointment from 2012 to 2018

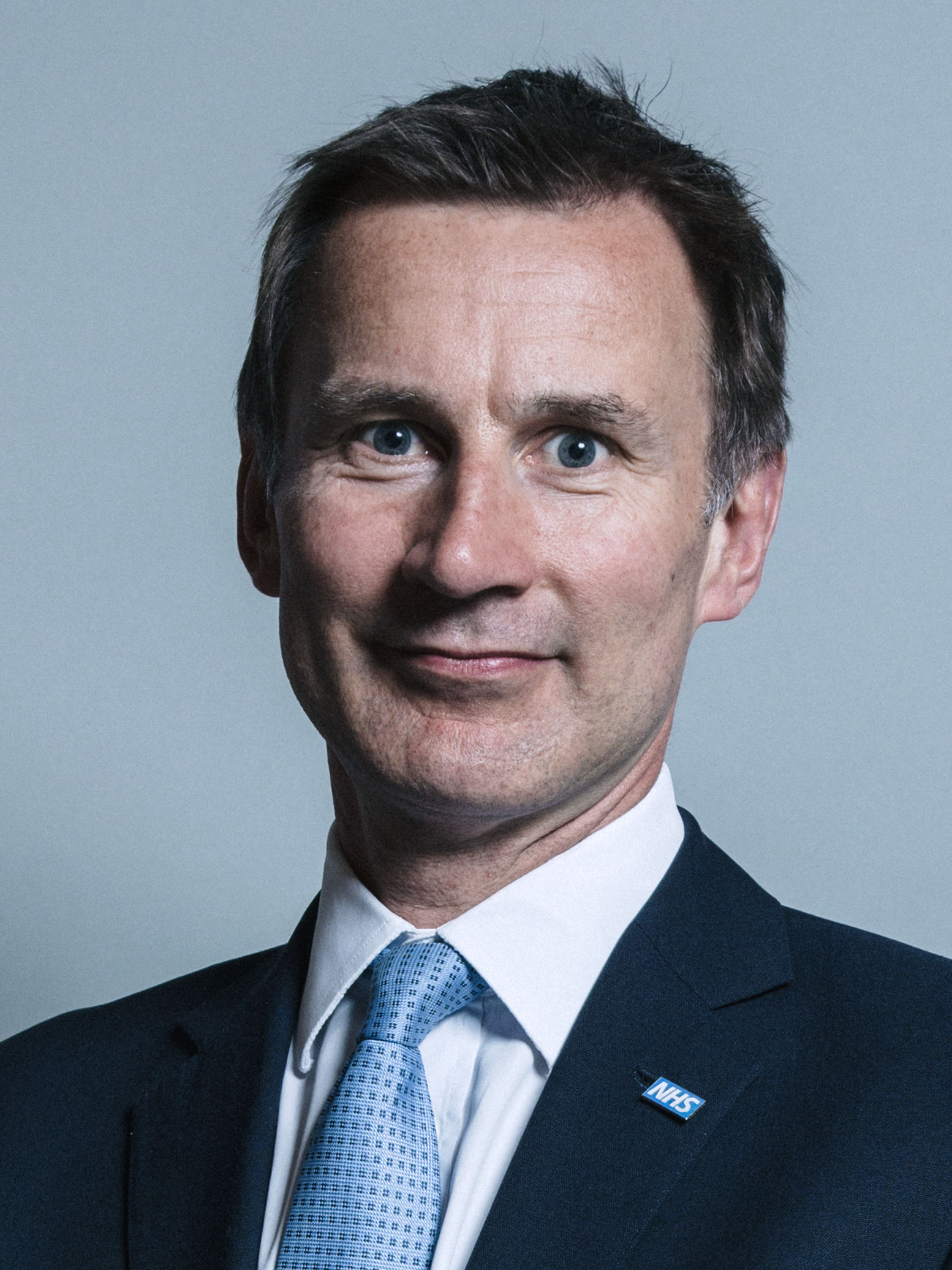
- Jeremy Hunt in his 2017 official portrait
- Jeremy Hunt's tenure as Health Secretary; 4 September 2012 – 9 July 2018
- Monarch: Elizabeth II
- Party: Conservative
- Election: 2010, 2015
- Nominated by: David Cameron; Theresa May

Jeremy Hunt served as Secretary of State for Health, later Secretary of State for Health and Social Care, from 2012 to 2018. Appointed by David Cameron, Hunt served in the Cameron–Clegg coalition and Cameron majority government. He was reappointed by Theresa May and served in the majority and minority May governments. In January 2018, Hunt gained additional responsibility for social care in England and, in June, became the longest-serving Health Secretary in British political history. He left the role when he was promoted to Foreign Secretary following the resignation of Boris Johnson, and was succeeded by Matt Hancock.

Hunt pursued an ambitious agenda to address patient safety, regional variations in premature deaths, health tourism and A&E waiting times. He oversaw decreased spending as percentage of GDP on the National Health Service compared to the previous government and hugely increased waiting times for patients. Healthcare costs always increase faster than GDP. He was criticised for controversial reforms, manipulating figures and increased privatisation. He implemented policies working towards a seven-day NHS and oversaw the imposition of a controversial new junior doctors' contract in England, after the failure of negotiations during a dispute in which junior doctors undertook industrial action.

== Appointment ==
Hunt was appointed Secretary of State for Health by David Cameron in a cabinet reshuffle on 4 September 2012, succeeding Andrew Lansley. Hunt had previously co-authored a book calling for the NHS "to be replaced by a new system of health provision in which people would pay money into personal health accounts, which they could then use to shop around for care from public and private providers. Those who could not afford to save enough would be funded by the state." In an attempt to better understand the NHS, he shadowed workers which eventually established his keystone policy: patient safety.

== Views ==
The Daily Telegraph science correspondent Tom Chivers expressed concern in 2012 that Hunt was known to have supported homoeopathy. In 2014 Hunt asked the Chief Medical Officer to initiate expert reviews of three homoeopathic studies carried out by Boiron, a French manufacturer of homoeopathic products. Later that year, Hunt denied personally being a supporter, and blamed his inexperience as a new MP for previously signing a pro-homeopathy early day motion. However, he did support NHS funding for it if recommended by a doctor.

In 2012, Hunt said that he was in favour of reducing the abortion limit from 24 weeks to 12 weeks. In 2013, he said that the regional variations in premature deaths throughout the United Kingdom were "shocking".

In February 2018, Hunt attracted attention after defending the universal coverage provided by the NHS against US President Donald Trump, saying "I may disagree with claims made on that march but not ONE of them wants to live in a system where 28m people have no cover. NHS may have challenges but I'm proud to be from the country that invented universal coverage – where all get care no matter the size of their bank balance".

== Health tourism ==
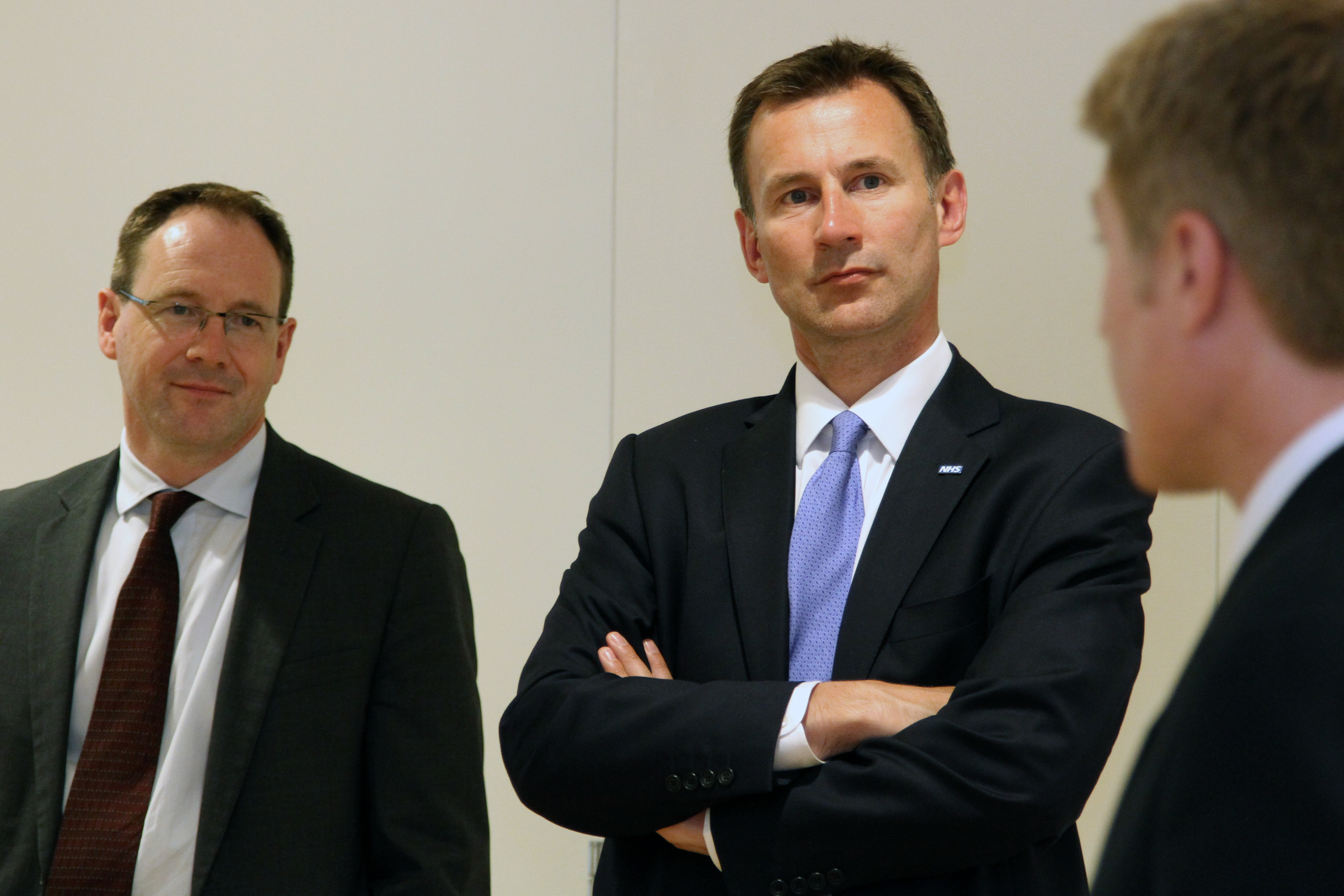
Jeremy Hunt during a trip to the US, in 2013

In 2013, Hunt announced plans to charge foreign nationals for using the NHS, claiming that the cost was up to £200 million though official figures put it at £33 million. However, £21 million of that £33 million was already recovered, putting the actual cost at £12 million – less than Hunt's crackdown could cost.

== A&E waiting times ==
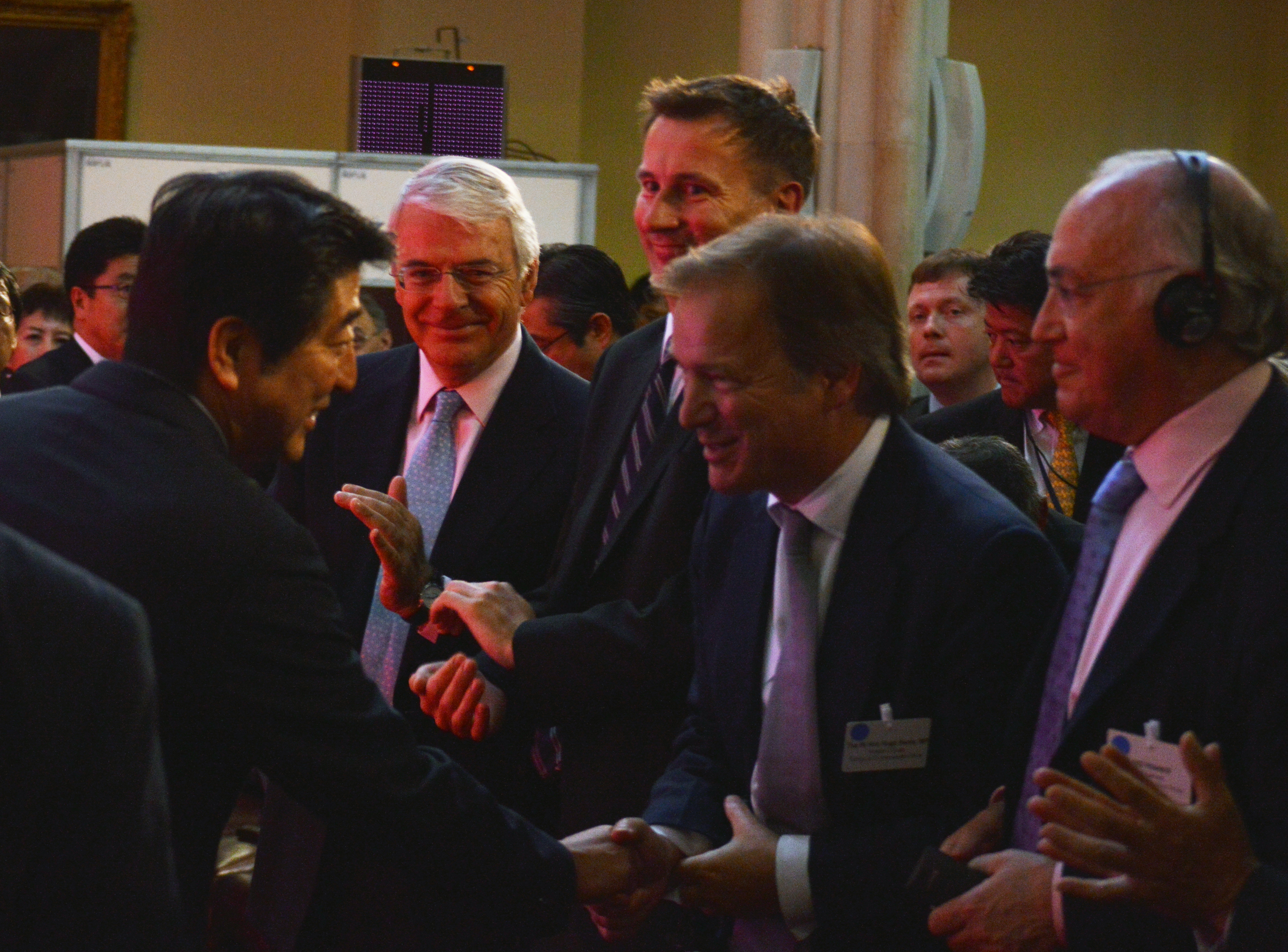
Japanese Prime Minister Shinzō Abe with John Major, Jeremy Hunt and Hugo Swire, in 2013

It was reported in December 2013 that Hunt was personally telephoning the Chairs of NHS hospital trusts where targets in Accident and Emergency (A&E) departments had been missed, a course of action which was described as "crazy" by David Prior, chairman of the Care Quality Commission and a former Conservative MP. Prior said that while Hunt, like his Labour predecessors, took responsibility, the result was money being diverted from primary and community care to A&E. However, Dr Clifford Mann, president of the Royal College of Emergency Medicine, blamed the problems on the Health and Social Care Act 2012 for causing "decision-making paralysis" and leaving the country short of around 375 emergency doctors.

In January 2018, Hunt apologised to patients in England affected by the decision to postpone tens of thousands of operations. Hunt made his comment as reports emerged of patients having to wait a long time to be treated, with ambulances left queuing outside A&E departments.

In March 2018, Hunt informed NHS trusts that they would not be required to meet waiting time targets for A&E patients in the following year. The decision was criticised by the Patients Association and National Voices.

== NHS pay ==
In March 2014, Hunt announced that the government would not give a recommended 1% pay rise to NHS non-medical staff receiving progression pay (around 55% of total non-medical staff). Later that year, he declared that patient choice was not key to improving NHS performance, in a major break from a policy favoured by Conservative and Labour governments over the previous 12 years. He stated that "there are natural monopolies in healthcare, where patient choice is never going to drive change". Following a pre-election report in April 2015 that hospital chiefs shared an average 6% pay rise totalling £35 million, Hunt promised to investigate if the Conservatives won the election.

== Outsourcing ==
In 2015, an undercover Daily Telegraph investigation showed that in some cases locum agencies, Medicare and Team24 owned by Capita were charging some hospitals higher fees than others and giving false company details. The agencies were charging up to 49% of the fee. Hunt criticised those who sought "big profits" at the expense of the NHS and taxpayers and promised to "reduce the margins rip-off agencies are able to generate."

== NHS weekend cover ==
In July 2015, Hunt indicated that he would be prepared to impose a new consultant contract on doctors in England which would remove the opt out for non-emergency work at weekends. He stated this was to prevent "about 6,000 avoidable deaths" resulting from a "Monday to Friday culture" in some areas of the NHS and to reintroduce "a sense of vocation" in consultants. The comments angered many doctors who responded by sharing photographs of themselves working at the weekends via social media using the hashtag #ImInWorkJeremy. It emerged in February 2016 that the "6,000 avoidable deaths" figure was based on Hunt's own understanding of an unpublished, unreviewed study by Freemantle et al. that he had access to before its publication in September 2015. The latter had been denied by NHS England's Freedom of Information Officer in October 2015. At the time NHS England also asked one of the authors to corroborate Hunt's figures who refused to do so, stating that it would interfere with the peer review of the unpublished paper; in response they reframed the figure as being based on earlier studies on its website in August 2015.

In October 2015, Hunt was accused by the editor of The BMJ Fiona Godlee of repeatedly misrepresenting a study published in the journal in the same year by Freemantle et al. on the weekend effect to parliament and the public. He had used the study as key evidence when stating in parliament and in interviews with the media that reduced staffing levels of doctors at weekends directly led to 11,000 excess deaths. Godlee asserted that the study's authors did not specify that the excess deaths were avoidable or that staffing levels were the cause. The lead author of the study Nick Freemantle, when asked about the study in February 2016, stated that they did not identify a cause for the excess deaths or establish the extent to which they were avoidable. Co-author NHS Medical Director Sir Bruce Keogh in response to Hunt's comments in October also stated "It is not possible to ascertain the extent to which these excess deaths may be preventable".

Hunt was also criticised for the fact that his claims about hospitals being more unsafe at weekends not merely misrepresented the facts but had potentially caused patients to delay going into hospitals and thus put them at risk. His critics described the Hunt Effect where patients who needed medical attention at a weekend had been deterred from doing so because they were persuaded that it would be better to wait until a Monday. Statisticians Professor David Spiegelhalter and David Craven, Dr Mark Porter, BMA council chair, Heidi Alexander, the shadow health secretary also denounced Hunt for making misleading statements about weekend hospital treatment after his assertion in parliament in the same month that "currently, across all key specialties, in only 10% of our hospitals are patients seen by a consultant within 14 hours of being admitted at the weekend." Speigelhalter stated that the data from NHS England showed that on average 79% of patients are seen within 14 hours by a consultant across all specialities and that this data is collected for the whole week so it would be flawed to state figures for the weekend as Hunt did. NHS England confirmed that it would not be possible to separate weekend and weekday performance from the data.

In January 2016, Hunt was criticised by top stroke doctors for using out-of-date data to try to show that stroke patients are more likely to die if they are admitted at weekends. They wrote that there had been significant improvements since 2004–12, when the data Hunt had referenced came from, and that new data showed there was "no longer any excess of hospital deaths in patients with stroke admitted at the weekend." Stroke specialist David Curtis said even the outdated statistics did not support Hunt's claims.

In February 2016, a mid-January internal report by the Department of Health was leaked. It stated the department was unable to find evidence to prove a link between increased consultant presence, availability of diagnostic tests, and reducing weekend mortality and length of stay. It also highlighted that the seven-day NHS could cost an additional £900 million each year, required the recruitment of 11,000 more staff including 4,000 doctors and 3,000 nurses, and that community and social services could struggle to handle more discharges at the weekend.

In May 2016, a report by the House of Commons public accounts committee criticised Hunt's plan for a seven-day NHS, saying "no coherent attempt" had made to understand staffing needs, the plan was "completely uncosted", and contained "serious flaws". Another study also concluded there was no evidence that people were more likely to die in hospitals at the weekend. In August, internal risk management documents produced by civil servants in the Department of Health in July were leaked. They described 13 major risks in delivering the "truly seven-day NHS" pledge promised by the Conservative party prior to the 2015 general election. These included a lack of staff and funding for the policy. The documents also discussed that no advance impact assessments had been made to show how the policy would affect the delivery of NHS services. Chris Hopson, chief executive of NHS Providers, the organisation that represents NHS services in England described the seven-day NHS plan as "impossible to deliver" due to a lack of funding and staffing. He also highlighted pressures on the NHS with 80% of acute hospitals in England in financial deficit compared to 5% in 2013 and an increase of missed A&E waiting time targets from 10% to 90% in the same time period.

== No-confidence petition ==
In July 2015, Hunt became the subject of the first petition on a new UK government website to reach the threshold of 100,000 signatures required for a petition to be considered for debate in Parliament. The petition called for a debate on a vote of "No Confidence" in Hunt as Health Secretary, and ultimately recorded 222,991 signatures leading to a debate on the motion being scheduled in September 2015. However, the Petitions Committee does not have the power to initiate a vote of no confidence, the committee instead debated the contracts and conditions of the NHS staff.

== Junior doctors' contracts ==
In September 2015, the Department of Health announced that they would impose new contracts for junior doctors in England after the British Medical Association (BMA), a professional association and trade union representing doctors said that they would not re-enter negotiations, despite the independent Doctors' and Dentists' remuneration review body recommending the deal. The new contracts would extend "normal hours", for which doctors would not be paid a premium, from 7 am to 7 pm Mondays to Fridays to 7 am to 10 pm on every day except Sunday while increasing their basic pay in a move that Hunt said would be cost neutral. In response the BMA balloted its members for industrial action, the first since the 1970s. They argued that the contract would include an increase in working hours with a relative pay cut of up to 40%, and refused to re-enter negotiations unless Hunt dropped his threat to impose a new contract and extensive preconditions, which he had refused to do. Many junior doctors said they would leave the NHS if the contract was forced through.

Hunt later tried to reassure the BMA that no junior doctor would face a pay cut, before admitting that those who worked longer than 56 hours a week would face a fall in pay. He said that working these long hours was unsafe. In November 2015, He said he would offer a basic pay increase of 11%, but still removing compensation for longer hours. In response, the BMA junior doctors committee chair, Johann Malawana, requested further details of the offer and said that "The increase in basic pay would be offset by changes to pay for unsocial hours, devaluing the vital work junior doctors do at evenings and weekends."

In February 2016, Hunt announced he would be unilaterally imposing the new junior doctors' contract without agreement or further negotiation, with NHS trusts instructed to introduce it in August. This followed David Dalton, the chief negotiator for the government and NHS Employers, reporting that junior doctors contract negotiations had ceased after his final offer to the BMA had been declined. The decision to impose angered many junior doctors, with some indicating that they would quit the NHS. Hunt acknowledged this by saying that there would be "considerable dismay", and also announced an urgent inquiry led by the chair of the Academy of Medical Royal Colleges Susan Bailey into junior doctors' morale and welfare. The Academy Trainee Doctors' Group (representatives for junior doctors from different royal colleges) voted unanimously not to participate in the review under the offered terms.

=== Junior doctors' strikes ===
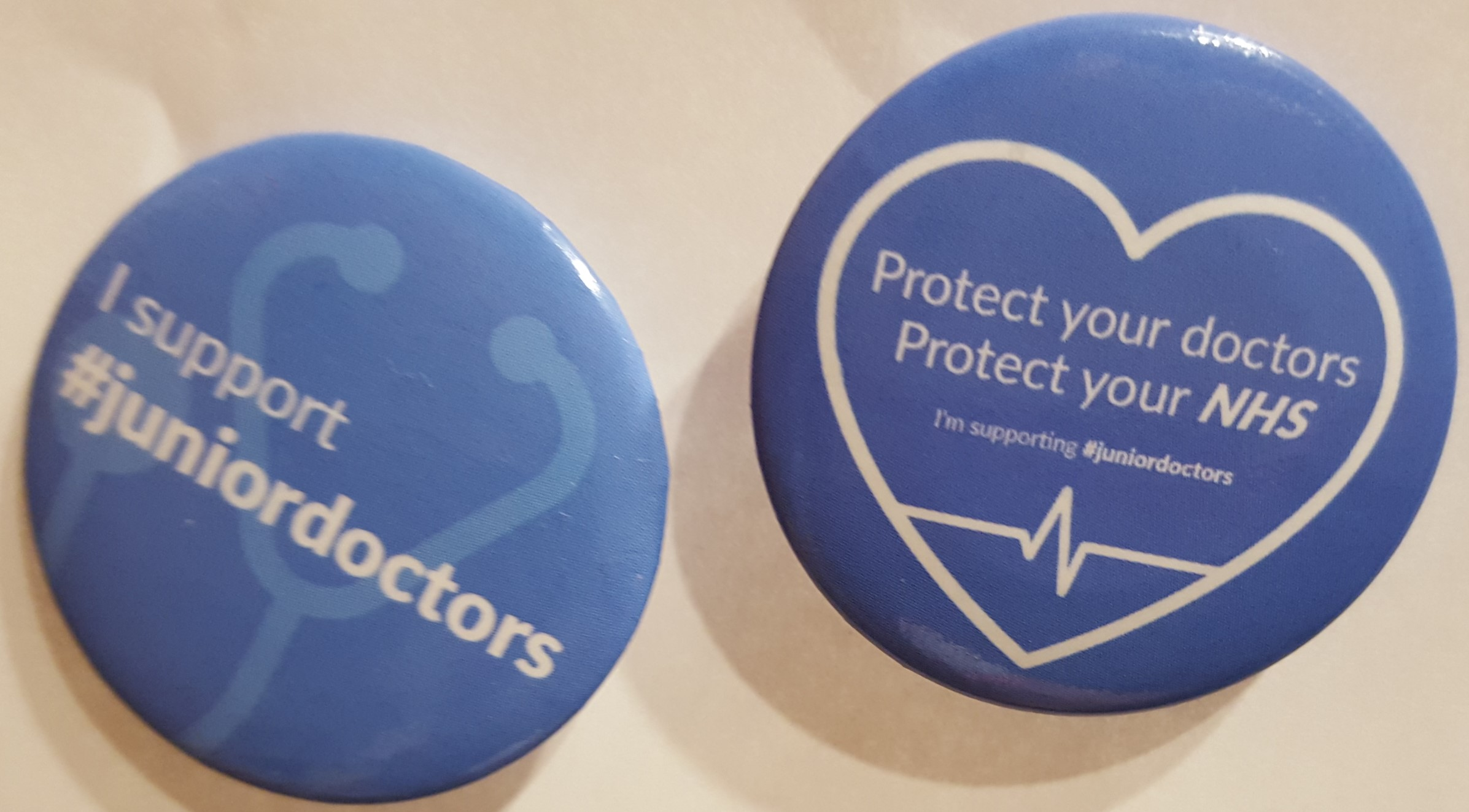
Junior doctors support badges

On 19 November 2015, the result of the BMA strike ballot was announced, with 99.4% in favour of industrial action short of a strike, and 98% voting for full strike action on a turnout of 76%. After the results were announced, the BMA council chair Mark Porter appealed to the health secretary to resume negotiations facilitated by Acas. More than a week later, Hunt agreed to discussions overseen by Acas and withdrew his threat to impose a new contract without agreement, and the first day of strike action was called off hours before it was due to start, which was too late to avoid some disruption.

An agreement was not reached by the junior doctors committee (JDC) 4 January 2016 deadline, so the BMA announced that a strike would go ahead, blaming "the government's continued failure to address junior doctors' concerns about the need for robust contractual safeguards on safe working, and proper recognition for those working unsocial hours." The first day of strike action was in January 2016 and involved junior doctors only providing emergency care. This was the first junior doctors' strike for forty years. Hunt said it was "unnecessary", that patients could be put at risk, and that many junior doctors had "ignored" the strike call and worked anyway, but the BMA responded that many junior doctors were in work maintaining emergency care as planned. A second day of strike action occurred on 10 February where doctors again provided only emergency care. In February 2016, he was polled as the "most disliked" frontline British politician.

In response to Hunt's announcement in February of the imposition of the new junior doctors' contract, the BMA announced three 48-hour long strikes where junior doctors would only provide emergency care. They also issued a legal challenge over the contract. Further talks after the strikes resulted in an agreement, to be put to a referendum. Hunt said he had lessons to learn, but continued to deny any personal responsibility for the dispute. The July referendum was open to BMA members who were junior doctors or medical students in the final two years of their degree. 58% of voters rejected the offer, with a 68% turnout. Following this, Malawana resigned, and Hunt rejected holding any further talks with the BMA and announced the imposition of the new contract on junior doctors starting from October.

In the lead up to his imposition of the contract, Hunt had repeatedly stated publicly and in Parliament his intention to do so. Even when challenged, he reiterated this intent and also confirmed that he had the power to do so. This matter was challenged in the High Court by a group of doctors, "Justice for Health". In order to successfully defend the case against him, lawyers acting on his behalf conceded that he did not actually have the power to impose the contract, and asserted that Hunt was not to be held accountable for things he had said in Parliament. They also argued the High Court did not have the authority to rule over whether he had misled Parliament.

== Hospital closures ==
In 2012, Hunt attempted to downgrade casualty and maternity units in Lewisham. Hunt stated that the cuts were necessary because neighbouring South London Healthcare NHS Trust had been losing more than £1m every week. But a campaign led by GP Dr Louise Irvine defeated Hunt in court in 2012 on this issue, with the judge ruling that Hunt acted outside his powers when he announced casualty and maternity units at Lewisham Hospital would be downgraded.

== Meningitis controversy ==
Hunt drew condemnation from medical professionals when it was reported in January 2016 he had suggested that parents should go online to look at photos of rashes if worried that a child may have meningitis. Specific disapproval was drawn to the fact that a rash caused by deadly meningitis can look very similar to other conditions, as well as professionals pointing out the time-critical nature of meningitis. The charity Meningitis Now said his advice was "potentially fatal".

== NHS funding ==
In July 2016 a cross-party committee of MP's ascertained that Hunt had 'broken his pledges on NHS funding and is misleading the public about health service reforms'. Specifically, it found that 'contrary to government claims to be injecting an extra £8.4bn into the NHS on top of inflation by 2020/21, the real figure was more likely to be £4.5bn'. The committee claimed the 'Government has used a different definition of spending to calculate the figures which made it appear that a larger increase in spending had occurred than was actually they case'.

In October 2016 Hunt was pressed on the issue of NHS funding by the Health Select Committee. Specifically, on the fact that in the previous November Hunt promised the NHS would receive an extra £10 billion a year above inflation, in the five years to 2020. But when questioned he conceded that in the accounts offered for spending had been stretched to include the previous year. This would therefore act to misleadingly inflate the spending figure by £1.5bn, according to a recent report. When challenged by the Health Select Committee, Hunt admitted "This amount of cash is being handed to the NHS... over the six years." He confirmed the period "includes the spending review period and an extra year". It is this use of an 'extra year' in the accounts which added further fuel to the claim that Hunt has knowingly misled the public on public health funding.

During 2017, Stephen Hawking publicly criticised Hunt's management of the NHS and supported legal action against further reforms, including accountable care organisations (ACOs). At a Royal Society of Medicine speech, Hawking accused Hunt of using studies that were not properly peer-reviewed, and ignoring other papers. In January 2018, Hawking won a case to take Hunt to court for alleged "back door privatisation of the NHS". However, the high Court ultimately ruled in Jeremy Hunt's favour, that ACOs are lawful. Moreover, the think tank King's Fund has noted that contrary to campaigners' concerns "there is nothing to suggest that accountable care will lead to private providers playing a bigger role in delivering clinical services than they do now".

== Patient safety ==
Hunt devoted considerable attention to questions of patient safety, insisting on seeing for himself letters of complaints from patients, and meeting with some of them, including James Titcombe and subsequently establishing the Healthcare Safety Investigation Branch.

== May cabinet ==
When Theresa May became Leader of the Conservative Party and Prime Minister in July 2016, Hunt retained his post of Health Secretary. Prior to May's 2018 cabinet reshuffle, it was reported he was to be moved to become Secretary of State for Business, Energy and Industrial Strategy and Business Secretary Greg Clark be moved to replace him. However, in an hour-long meeting with May, Hunt defended his position as Health Secretary and convinced May to allow him to remain in post, add social care in England to his brief and have the Department for Health be renamed the Department of Health and Social Care.

In June 2018, Hunt became the longest-serving Health Secretary in British political history. In July, Boris Johnson resigned as Secretary of State for Foreign and Commonwealth Affairs over disagreements with Theresa May's negotiated Brexit withdrawal agreement. Hunt was appointed by May to replace him, while Matt Hancock succeeded Hunt as Health Secretary. As Foreign Secretary, Hunt said in April 2019 he hoped to champion NHS reform upon his retirement from frontbench politics: "to do for patient safety what Al Gore has done for climate change".

== Brexit ==
In 2016, Hunt called for a reduction in the number of foreign doctors working in the NHS after the UK left the EU. At the Conservative Party Conference later in the month, Hunt pledged that by 2025, the NHS would be "self-sufficient in doctors". He announced an increase of up to 1,500 extra places at medical schools in the UK in 2018, with it being partly funded by an increase in international medical student fees. Hunt also stated UK medical students would be forced to work in the NHS for at least four years or have to repay the cost of their training, around £220,000.

== See also ==
- Premiership of David Cameron
- Premiership of Theresa May
