= Chaand Nagpaul =

British physician

Chaand Nagpaul CBE is a British doctor who works as a general practitioner and was Chair of the Council of the British Medical Association from 2017 to 2022. Nagpaul took over as chair from Mark Porter in June 2017.

== Early life ==
Nagpaul was born in Kenya to Indian parents, and moved to England at a young age. He commenced medical undergraduate studies in October 1979 at St Bartholomew's Hospital Medical College, qualifying with MBBS degree in 1985 with full registration with GMC in 1986.

== Medical career ==
Nagpaul has been a general practitioner in Stanmore since 1990. He was inspired to become a GP when he attended a practice in inner London while a medical student, although this was not his initial field, having worked for 5 years in various hospital posts after qualifying.

He has held many offices in the BMA; having been a Local Medical Committee (LMC) member for over 20 years and vice-chair for the 12 years. He is a BMA Council member, a member of its Political Board, and GPC member on the BMA Public Health Committee and Consultants Committee, as well as being Honorary Secretary of his local BMA Division.

In April 2016, he was re-elected to the council of the Council of the BMA.

He has been prominent in defending the profession against government policies, as the principal spokesperson for UK general practitioners. He said in August 2013 that Ministers must realise their mistakes and begin to see GPs as the solution to their problems, rather than the cause.

Nagpaul became Chair of the Council of the BMA in June 2017, succeeding Mark Porter.

== Honours and awards ==
Nagpaul is a fellow of the Royal College of General Practitioners.

The Health Service Journal included him in several features, listing him as the 25th most powerful person in the English NHS in December 2013 and in the list of their 100 top clinical leaders in 2014.

He was made a Commander of the Order of the British Empire (CBE) in the 2015 Birthday Honours for services to primary care.
