= 2015 junior doctors contract dispute in England =

A junior doctors contract dispute in England led to industrial action being taken in 2015 and 2016. A negotiation between NHS Employers and the main UK doctor's union, the British Medical Association (BMA), had been overshadowed by the Secretary of State for Health, Jeremy Hunt, threatening to impose certain aspects. The BMA balloted members in November 2015 and industrial action was scheduled for the following month. The initial action was suspended, although further talks broke down. Junior doctors took part in a general strike across the NHS in England on 12 January 2016, the first such industrial action in 40 years. Junior doctors again withdrew their labour for routine care on 10 February. On 26 April 2016, junior doctors withdrew from emergency and routine care, the first time this had happened.

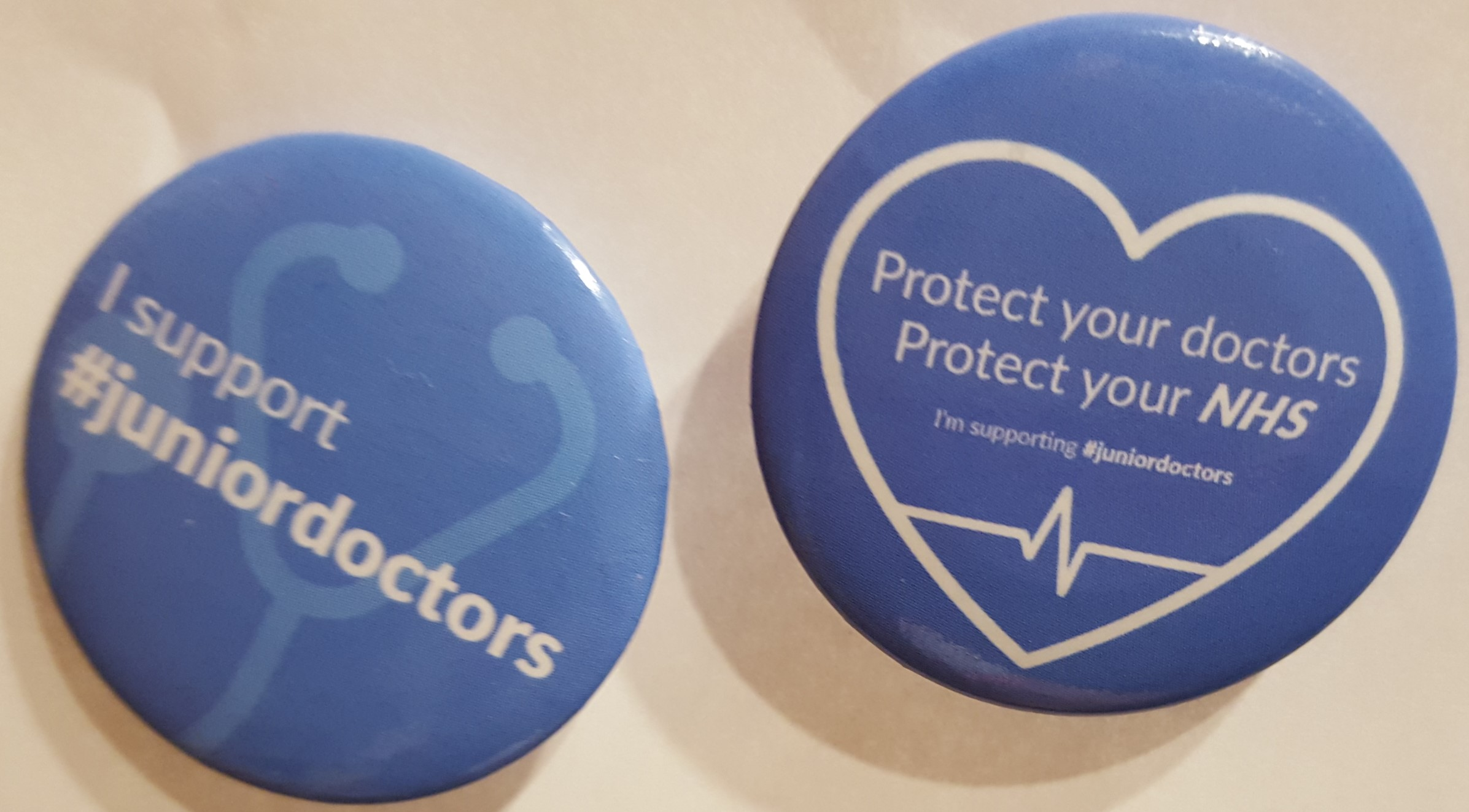
Junior doctors support badges

== Proposed new contracts ==
Since 2012 NHS Employers and the BMA had been in negotiation towards a new contract for junior doctors. These talks ran into serious problems when the BMA rejected the proposals from the Secretary of State for Health, Jeremy Hunt, who wanted the contracts to reflect commitments made in the Conservative 2015 election manifesto upon junior doctors in England. In September 2015, Hunt proposed new contracts for junior doctors which would scrap overtime rates for work between 7am and 10pm on every day except Sunday while increasing their basic pay. Hunt claimed that this would be cost neutral, but the union responded by saying that NHS Employers had been unable to support this claim with robust data. The union argued that the contract would include an increase in working hours with a relative pay cut of up to 40%, and refused to re-enter negotiations unless Hunt dropped his threat to impose a new contract and extensive preconditions, which he had refused to do. The Department of Health responded, saying "We are not cutting the pay bill for junior doctors and want to see their basic pay go up just as average earnings are maintained."

On 26 September the BMA announced that it would ballot its members. By October, a survey showed many junior doctors would consider leaving the NHS if the contract was forced through. Hunt later tried to re-assure the union that no junior doctor would face a pay cut, before admitting those who worked longer than 56 hours a week would face a fall in pay. He said that working these long hours was unsafe, claiming that existing pay arrangements were known colloquially in the NHS as "danger money", although a Facebook survey carried out by one doctor showed that 99.7% of 1,200 respondents had never heard of the term.

On 3 November 2015 Hunt said he would offer a basic pay increase of 11%, but still removing compensation for longer hours. In response, the BMA junior doctors committee chair, Johann Malawana, said: "Junior doctors need facts, not piecemeal announcements and we need to see the full detail of this latest, eleventh hour offer to understand what, in reality, it will mean for junior doctors. We have repeatedly asked for such detail in writing from the Secretary of State, but find, instead, that this has been released to media without sharing it with junior doctors' representatives" and "The proposals on pay, not for the first time, appear to be misleading. The increase in basic pay would be offset by changes to pay for unsocial hours, devaluing the vital work junior doctors do at evenings and weekends."

== Balloting of BMA members ==
On 5 November 2015, the BMA began its ballot of over 37,700 of their members in response to Hunt's contract proposals. On 19 November 2015 the result of the strike ballot was announced, with more than 99% in favour of industrial action short of a strike, and 98% voting for full strike action. 76% of eligible doctors voted with 99.6% of doctors voting for action short of strike and 98% voting for all out strike. After five days of talks between the government and BMA, conciliation service Acas confirmed that agreement had been reached to suspend the strike action that had been planned for December.

== First period of arbitration ==
The BMA council chair, Mark Porter appealed to the health secretary to resume negotiations. Hunt said the strike was "very disappointing", but declined the appeal for arbitration at this time. He was criticized for failing to answer MPs' questions about the strike, with his deputy claiming he was too busy preparing for the strike.

He was also criticised by statisticians Prof David Spiegelhalter and David Craven, by Dr Mark Porter, by an NHS England spokesperson, and by Heidi Alexander, the shadow health secretary, for, again, making misleading statements about weekend hospital treatment. The Department of Health confirmed his 10% figure actually related to the entire week, even though Hunt specifically said it was for weekend-admitted patients only.

Hunt eventually agreed to discussions overseen by Acas and withdrew his threat to impose a new contract without agreement, and the first day of strike action was called off hours before it was due to start (too late to avoid some disruption), with later days suspended.

== Appeal for further arbitration ==
On 24 December 2015, Johann Malawana gave a 4 January deadline for the talks to result an acceptable outcome, or industrial action would be announced. An agreement was not reached by this deadline and so the union announced that a strike would go ahead, blaming "the government's continued failure to address junior doctors' concerns about the need for robust contractual safeguards on safe working, and proper recognition for those working unsocial hours". On 8 January, it was revealed that a supposedly independent response to the initial strike plans from Sir Bruce Keogh, medical director of NHS England, had been strengthened by Department of Health officials and approved by Hunt. Subsequently, more than 1,000 doctors called on Keogh to resign complaining that Hunt had exploited him for political gain.

== Strikes ==
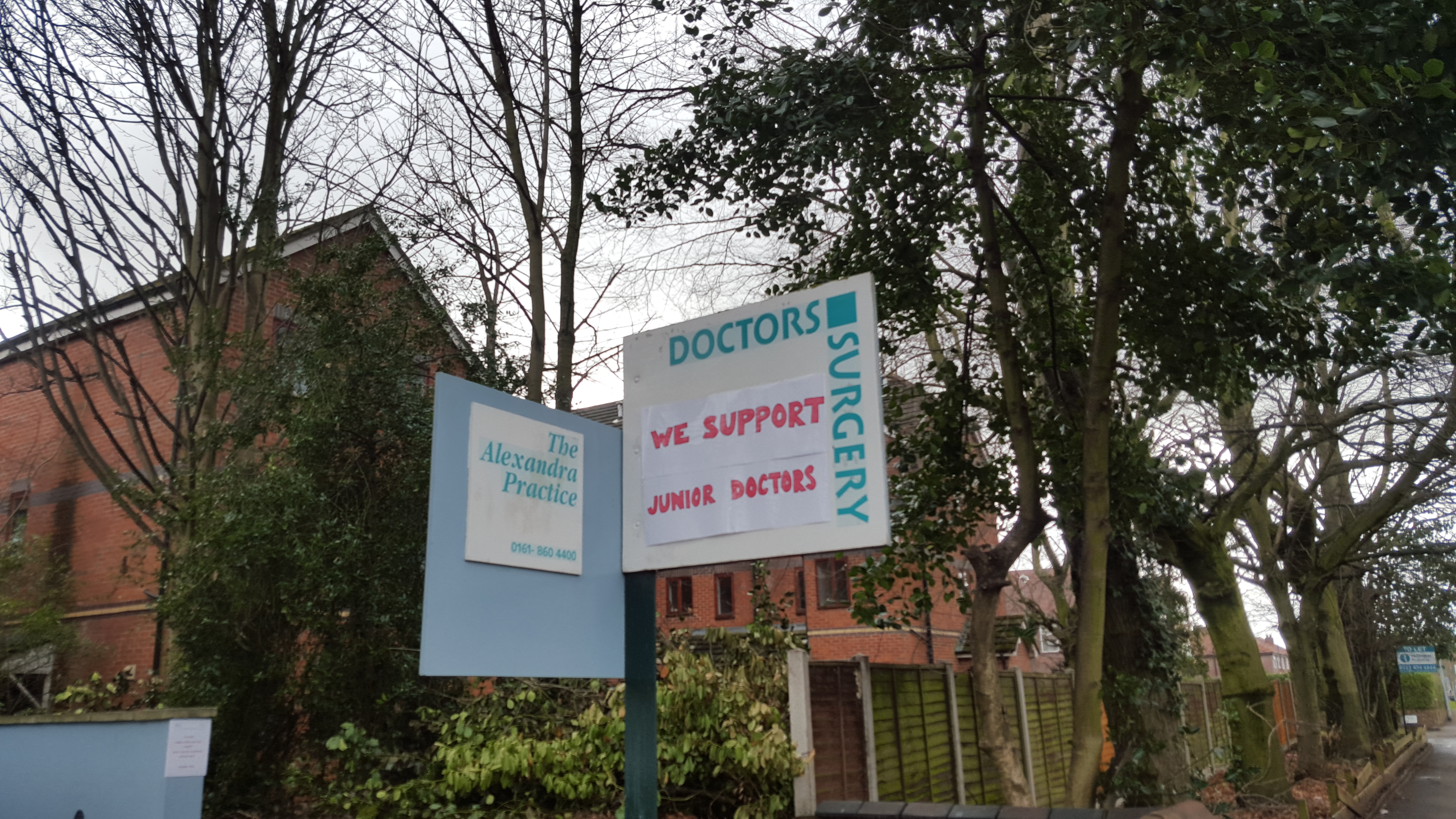
Support for the junior doctors dispute from a GP surgery

On 12 January 2016, Junior Doctors in England took part in the first general strike across the NHS, the first such industrial action in 40 years. Emergency care was still provided. Hunt claimed it was "unnecessary", that patients could be put at risk, and that many junior doctors had "ignored" the strike call and worked anyway, but the BMA responded that many junior doctors were in work maintaining emergency care as planned. There were claims that Bruce Keogh, had used performance target levels to justify and encourage NHS trusts to declare an emergency situation, forcing Junior Doctors to work despite the strike, a move which the BMA condemned.

Junior doctors again withdrew their labour for routine care on 10 February 2016, leading to the cancellation of around 3,000 elective operations. On 26 April 2016, junior doctors in England embarked on the first strike where they withdrew routine and emergency cover.

In July 2016 the BMA balloted their members, who voted 58% to 42% against the deal. Johann Malawana resigned from the position of chair of the JDC on 5 July 2016.

Compared with the weeks preceding and following the strikes, there were 9.1% (31,651) fewer hospital admissions, 6.8% (23,895) fewer A&E attendances, and 6% (173,462) fewer outpatient appointments than expected. Altogether during the strikes hospitals cancelled 294,844 outpatient appointments. There was no significant effect on the number of recorded deaths.

== See also ==
- 2022–2024 National Health Service strikes
