= Weekend effect =

Concept in healthcare

In healthcare, the weekend effect is the finding of a difference in mortality rate for patients admitted to hospital for treatment at the weekend compared to those admitted on a weekday. The effects of the weekend on patient outcomes has been a concern since the late 1970s, and a 'weekend effect' is now well documented. Although this is a controversial area, the balance of opinion is that the weekend (and bank holidays) have a deleterious effect on patient care (and specifically increase mortality)—based on the larger studies that have been carried out. Variations in the outcomes for patients treated for many acute and chronic conditions have been studied.

== Published research: Non-disease specific (unselected) patients ==
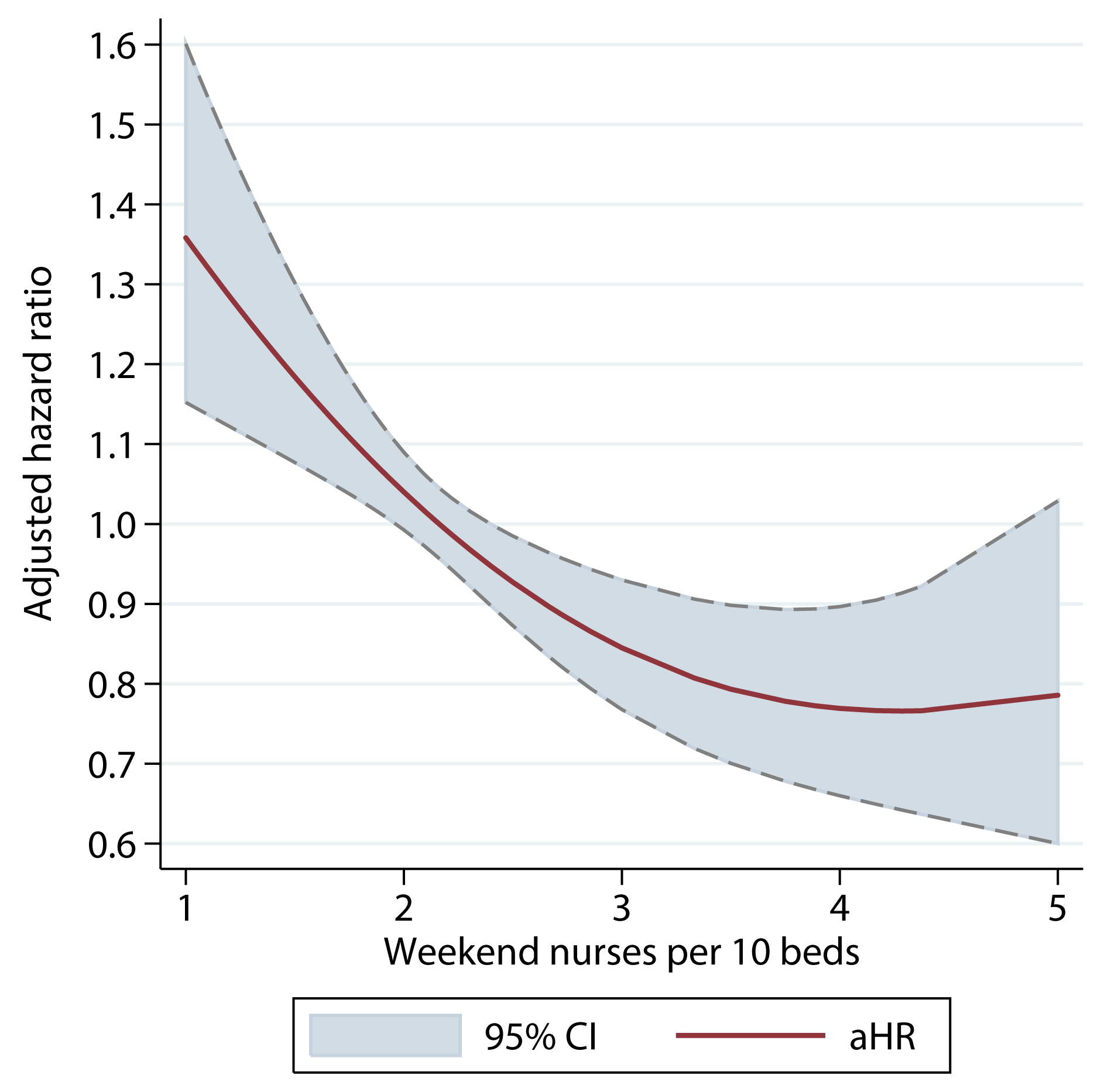
This figure shows the change in mortality for stroke patients over 30 days in a UK sample as the number of nurses relative to the number of beds in the hospital changes, adjusting for various covariates.

=== Medical patients ===
Schmulewitz et al., in the UK in 2005, studied 3,244 patients with chronic obstructive pulmonary disease, cerebrovascular accidents, pulmonary embolism, pneumonia, collapse and upper gastrointestinal bleed. They found "Weekend admission was not associated with significantly higher in-hospital mortality, readmission rates or increased length of stay compared to the weekday equivalent for any of the six conditions".

However, in 2010, Clarke et al., in a much larger Australian study of 54,625 mixed medical/surgical non-elective admissions showed a significant weekend effect (i.e. worse mortality) for acute myocardial infarction. Marco et al. (2011), in a US study of 429,880 internal medical admissions showed that death within 2 days after admission was significantly higher for a weekend admission, when compared to a weekday one (OR = 1.28; 95% CI = 1.22-1.33). In the same year, in an Irish study of 25,883 medical admissions (Mikulich et al.), patients admitted at the weekend had an approximate 11% increased 30-day in-hospital mortality, compared with a weekday admission; although this was not statistically significant either before or after risk adjustment. Thus the authors pointed out that "admission at the weekend was not independently predictive in a risk model that included Illness Severity (age and biochemical markers) and co-morbidity".

There is some evidence for intervention from physicians, in an attempt to address this issue. Bell et al., in 2013, surveyed 91 acute hospital sites in England to evaluate systems of consultant cover for acute medical admissions. An 'all inclusive' pattern of consultant working, incorporating all guideline recommendations (and which included the minimum consultant presence of 4 hours per day) was associated with reduced excess weekend mortality (p<0.05).

In 2014, it was shown in a huge US study, that the presence of resident trainee doctors (and nurses) may also be of benefit (Ricciardi, 2014). In this study of 48,253,968 medical patients, the relative risk of mortality was 15% higher following weekend admission as compared to weekday admission. This is currently the largest known study in this area. After adjusting for diagnosis, age, sex, race, income level, payer, comorbidity, and weekend admission, the overall odds of mortality was higher for patients in hospitals with fewer nurses and staff physicians. Mortality following a weekend admission for patients admitted to a hospital with resident trainees was significantly higher (17%) than hospitals with no resident trainees (p<0.001).

In the following year, Vest-Hansen et al.—in a whole nation study, in Denmark—studied 174,192 acute medical patients. The age-standardised and sex-standardised 30-day mortality rate was 5.1% (95% CI 5.0-5.3) after admission during weekday office hours, 5.7% (95% CI 5.5-6.0) after admission during weekday (out of hours), 6.4% (95% CI 6.1-6.7) after admission during weekend daytime hours, and 6.3% (95% CI 5.9-6.8) after admission during weekend night-time hours. In 2016, Huang et al., in Taiwan, studied 82,340 patients, admitted to the internal medicine departments of 17 medical centres. Patients admitted at the weekend had higher in-hospital mortality (OR = 1.19; 95% CI 1.09-1.30; p < 0.001).

In a 2016 study of 12 Italian Acute Medical Units, Ambrosi et al. found that elderly patients were six times (95% CI 3.6-10.8) more likely at risk of dying at weekends. They also found that "those with one or more ED admissions in the last 3 months were also at increased risk of dying (RR = 1.360, 95% CI 1.02-1.81) as well as those receiving more care from family carers (RR = 1.017, 95% CI 1.001–1.03). At the nursing care level, those patient receiving less care by Registered Nurses (RNs) at weekends were at increased risk of dying (RR = 2.236, 95% CI 1.27-3.94) while those receiving a higher skill-mix, thus indicating that more nursing care was offered by RNs instead of Nursing Auxiliaries were at less risk of dying (RR = 0.940, 95% CI = 0.91-0.97)."

Conway et al., in 2017, studied of 44,628 Irish medical patients. Weekend admissions had an increased mortality of 5.0%, compared with weekday admissions of 4.5%. Survival curves showed no mortality difference at 28 days (P = 0.21) but a difference at 90 days (P = 0.05).

The effects of the introduction of a 7-day consultant service have been investigated in medical patients. In 2015, Leong et al. studied elderly medical patients in the UK; noting admission numbers increasing from 6,304 (November 2011-July 2012) to 7,382 (November 2012-July 2013), with no change in acuity score. They stated that the "introduction of seven-day consultant working was associated with a reduction in in-hospital mortality from 11.4% to 8.8% (p<0.001)". Weekend discharges increased from general medical wards (from 13.6% to 18.8%, p<0.001) but did not increase from elderly medicine wards.

In December 2016, another study found that reports of higher weekend mortality rates were based on administrative databases with incomplete information about the clinical state of patients on admission, and that studies that used better data found no greater risk.

=== Surgical patients ===
Non-elective (emergency) Patients There have been many similar studies (with similar conclusions) in surgery. In the US, in a very large study in 2011, 29,991,621 non-elective general surgical hospital admissions were studied (Ricciardi et al.). Inpatient mortality was reported as 2.7% for weekend and 2.3% for weekday admissions (p<0.001). Regression analysis revealed significantly higher mortality during weekends for 15 of the 26 (57.7%) major diagnostic categories. The weekend effect remained, and mortality was noted to be 10.5% higher during weekends compared with weekdays after adjusting for all other variables.

In another huge US study in 2016 (Ricciardi et al., 2016), 28,236,749 non-elective surgical patients were evaluated, with 428,685 (1.5%) experiencing one or more Patient Safety Indicator (PSI) events. The rate of PSI was the same for patients admitted on weekends as compared to weekdays (1.5%). However, the risk of mortality was 7% higher if a PSI event occurred to a patient admitted on a weekend, as compared with a weekday. In addition, compared to patients admitted on weekdays, patients admitted on weekends had a 36% higher risk of postoperative wound dehiscence, 19% greater risk of death in a low-mortality diagnostic-related group, 19% increased risk of postoperative hip fracture, and 8% elevated risk of surgical inpatient death.

Also in 2016, Ozdemir et al. studied 294,602 surgical emergency admissions to 156 NHS Trusts (hospital systems) in the UK, with a 30-day mortality of 4.2%. Trust-level mortality rates for this cohort ranged from 1.6 to 8.0%. The lowest mortality rates were observed in hospitals with higher levels of medical and nursing staffing, and a greater number of operating theatres and critical care beds relative to provider size. Higher mortality rates were seen in patients admitted to hospital at weekends [OR = 1.11; 95% CI 1.06-1.17; p<0.0001], in hospitals with fewer general surgical doctors [OR = 1.07; 95% CI 1.01-1.13; p=0.019] and with lower nursing staff ratios [OR = 1.0; 95% CI 1.01-1.13; p=0.024].

McLean et al., in the UK, also in 2016, studied 105,002 elderly (≥70 years) emergency general surgical admissions. Factors associated with increased 30-day in-hospital mortality were increasing age and Charlson score, admissions directly from clinic, operations undertaken at the weekend, and patients admitted earlier in the study period.

Elective patients The effect is not just seen in non-elective surgical patients. Aylin et al. (2013) in the UK, investigated 27,582 deaths (within 30 days) after 4,133,346 inpatient admissions for elective operating room procedures; overall crude mortality rate was 6.7 per 1000). The adjusted odds of death were 44% and 82% higher, respectively, if the procedures were carried out on a Friday (OR = 1.44, 95% CI 1.39-1.50) or a weekend (OR = 1.82, 95% CI 1.71-1.94) compared with a Monday.

In a Canadian study (McIsaac et al., 2014), 333,344 elective surgical patients were studied, of whom 2826 died within 30 days of surgery; overall crude mortality rate was 8.5 deaths per 1000. Undergoing elective surgery on the weekend was associated with a 1.96 times higher odds of 30-day mortality than weekday surgery (95% CI 1.36-2.84). This significant increase in the odds of postoperative mortality was confirmed using a multivariable logistic regression analysis (OR = 1.51; 95% CI 1.19-1.92).

Both non-elective and elective patients Mohammed et al., in 2012 in the UK, compared elective and non-elective admissions, in terms of day of admission. The mortality for non-elective patients following weekday admission was 0.52% (7,276/1,407,705), compared with 0.77% (986/127,562) following weekend admission. Of the 3,105,249 emergency admissions, 76.3% (2,369,316) were admitted on a weekday and 23.7% (735,933) were admitted at the weekend. The mortality following emergency weekday admission was 6.53% compared to 7.06% following weekend admission. After case-mix adjustment, weekend admissions were associated with an increased risk of death, especially in the elective setting (elective OR = 1.32, 95% CI 1.23- 1.41; vs emergency OR = 1.09, 95% CI 1.05-1.13).

In a 2016 Australian study (Singla et al.), of 7718 elective and non-elective patients, it was shown that unadjusted and adjusted odds of early surgical mortality was higher on the weekend, compared to weekdays (unadjusted and adjusted OR = 1.30 (p<0.001) and 1.19 (p=0.026), respectively). When separated by day of week, there was a trend for higher surgical mortality on Friday, Saturday and Sunday vs all other days, although this did not reach statistical significance.

In the US, also in 2016, Glance et al. conducted a study of 305,853 elective and non-elective surgical patients; undergoing isolated coronary artery bypass graft surgery, colorectal surgery, open repair of abdominal aortic aneurysm, endovascular repair of abdominal aortic aneurysm, and lower extremity revascularisation. After controlling for patient risk and surgery type, weekend elective surgery (OR = 3.18; 95% CI 2.26-4.49; p<0.001) and weekend urgent surgery (OR = 2.11; 95% CI 1.68-2.66; p<0.001) were associated with a higher risk of death compared with weekday surgery. Weekend elective (OR = 1.58; 95% CI 1.29-1.93; p<0.001) and weekend urgent surgery (OR = 1.61; 95% CI 1.42-1.82; p<0.001) were also associated with a higher risk of major complications compared with weekday surgery.

=== Emergency department (ED) patients ===
ED admissions have also been well studied. The first major study was published in 2001 by Bell et al. In this Canadian study, 3,789,917 ED admissions were analysed. Weekend admissions were associated with significantly higher in-hospital mortality rates than weekday admissions among patients with ruptured abdominal aortic aneurysms (42% vs 36%, p<0.001), acute epiglottitis (1.7% vs 0.3%, p=0.04), and pulmonary embolism (13% vs 11%, p=0.009).

In another Canadian study (Cram et al., 2004), 641,860 admissions from the ED were investigated. The adjusted odds of death for patients admitted on weekends when compared with weekdays was 1.03 (95% CI 1.01-1.06; p=0.005). The weekend effect was larger in major teaching hospitals compared with non-teaching hospitals (OR = 1.13 vs 1.03, p=0.03) and minor teaching hospitals (OR = 1.05, p=0.11).

In a UK study in 2010, Aylin et al. studied 4,317,866 ED admissions, and found 215,054 in-hospital deaths with an overall crude mortality rate of 5.0% (5.2% for all weekend admissions and 4.9% for all weekday admissions). The overall adjusted odds of death for all emergency admissions was 10% higher (OR = 1.10; 95% CI 1.08-1.11) in those patients admitted at the weekend compared with patients admitted during a weekday (p<0.001).

Handel et al., in 2012, carried out a similar study in the UK (Scotland) on 5,271,327 ED admissions. There was a significantly increased probability of death associated with a weekend emergency admission compared with admission on a weekday (OR = 1.27; 95% CI 1.26-1.28, p<0.0001). However, in 2013, Powell et al., in the US, analysed 114,611 ED admissions with a principal diagnosis consistent with sepsis, and found that the difference for overall inpatient mortality (in terms of the weekend) was not significant (17.9% vs 17.5%, p=0.08).

In 2016, Shin et al., in Taiwan, studied 398,043 patients with severe sepsis. Compared with patients admitted on weekends, patients admitted on weekdays had a lower 7-day mortality rate (OR = 0.89, 95% CI 0.87-0.91), 14-day mortality rate (OR = 0.92, 95% CI 0.90-0.93), and 28-day mortality rate (OR = 0.97, 95% CI 0.95-0.98).

Also in the US, in 2013, Sharp et al. studied 4,225,973 adult ED admissions. They found that patients admitted on the weekend were significantly more likely to die than those admitted on weekdays (OR = 1.073; 95% CI 1.06-1.08). However, Smith et al. (2014) in a smaller study (of 20,072 patients) in the US, found that weekend mortality was not significantly higher at 7 days (OR = 1.10; 95% CI 0.92-1.31; p=0.312) or at 30 days (OR = 1.07; 95% CI 0.94-1.21; p=0.322). By contrast, they found adjusted public holiday mortality in the all public holidays was 48% higher at 7 days (OR = 1.48; 95% CI 1.12-1.95; p=0.006) and 27% higher at 30 days (OR = 1.27; 95% CI 1.02-1.57; p=0.031).

Also in 2014, in an Australian study, Concha et al. studied 3,381,962 ED admissions; and found that sixteen of 430 diagnosis groups had a significantly increased risk of death following weekend admission. They accounted for 40% of all deaths, and demonstrated different excess mortality risk patterns: early care effect (cardiac arrest); care effect washout (e.g., pulmonary embolism); patient effect (e.g., cancer admissions) and mixed (e.g., stroke). These findings are consistent with most of the disease-specific studies outlined below.

Blecker et al., in 2015, in the US, studied 57,163 ED admissions, before and after implementation of an intervention to improve patient care at weekends. The average length of stay decreased by 13% (95% CI 10-15%) and continued to decrease by 1% (95% CI 1-2%) per month as compared to the underlying time trend. The proportion of weekend discharges increased by 12% (95% CI 2-22%) at the time of the intervention and continued to increase by 2% (95% CI 1-3%) per month thereafter. However, the intervention had no impact on readmissions or mortality.

In a smaller Danish study (of 5,385 patients) in 2016, it was found that there was a higher mortality for patients attending the ED during the evening shift than during the dayshifts, and during weekends than during weekdays (Biering et al.). Patients attending the ED during the night shift had no excess mortality compared with the day shifts. The combination of evening shift and weekday and the combination of dayshift and weekend reached significance.

Not all ED studies show the weekend effect. Some argue that it relates to higher acuity patients being admitted over the weekend.

=== Intensive care unit patients ===
As well as ED, ICU care has been extensively studied in terms of weekend mortality. In 2002, Barnett et al. studied 156,136 patients in the US. They found the in-hospital death was 9% higher (OR = 1.09; 95% CI 1.04-1.15; p<0.001) for weekend admissions (Saturday or Sunday) than in patients admitted midweek (Tuesday to Thursday). However, the adjusted odds of death were also higher (p<0.001) for patients admitted on a Monday (OR = 1.09) or a Friday (OR = 1.08). Findings were generally similar in analyses stratified by admission type (medical vs. surgical), hospital teaching status, and illness severity.

In 2003, in Finland, Uusaro et al., studied 23,134 consecutive ICU patients. Adjusted ICU-mortality was higher for weekend as compared with weekday admissions (OR = 1.20; 95% CI 1.01-1.43).

But not all ICU studies show an effect. For example, in the following year, Ensminger et al.(2004) published a similar study in the US, looking at a significantly smaller population (of 29,084 patients). In multivariable analyses - controlling for the factors associated with mortality such as APACHE (acute physiology and chronic health evaluation) III predicted mortality rate, ICU admission source, and intensity of treatment - no statistically significant difference in hospital mortality was found between weekend and weekday admissions in the study population (OR = 1.06; 95% CI 0.95-1.17)

A small study in Saudi Arabia was published by Arabi et al. in 2006. A total of 2,093 admissions were included in the study. Again, there was no significant difference in hospital mortality rate between weekends and weekdays. Similarly, Laupland et al., in 2008, in Canada studied 20,466 ICU admissions. After controlling for confounding variables using logistic regression analyses, neither weekend admission nor discharge was associated with death. However, both night admission and discharge were independently associated with mortality.

However, in 2011, Bhonagiri et al., in a huge study of 245,057 admissions in 41 Australian ICUs, found that weekend admissions had a 20% hospital mortality rate compared with 14% on weekdays (p<0.001), with SMRs of 0.95 (95% CI 0.94-0.97) and 0.92 (95% CI 0.92-0.93). Conversely, Ju et al., in China, in 2013 studied 2,891 consecutive ICU patients; and found no mortality difference between weekend and workday admissions (p= 0.849).

In a French study in 2015, 5,718 ICU inpatient stays were included (Neuraz et al.).The risk of death increased by 3.5 (95% CI 1.3-9.1) when the patient-to-nurse ratio was greater than 2.5, and by 2.0 (95% CI 1.3-3.2) when the patient-to-physician ratio exceeded 14. The highest ratios occurred more frequently during the weekend for nurse staffing and during the night for physicians (p<0.001).

In another small French study (in 2016), Brunot et al., investigated 2428 patients. They found that weeknight and weekend (off-hour admissions), did not influence the prognosis of ICU patients. However, they did conclude that the higher illness severity of patients admitted during the second part of the night (00:00-07:59) may explain the observed increased mortality of that time period.

Also in 2016, Arulkamaran et al., in the UK, studied 195,428 ICU patients. After adjustment for casemix, there was no difference between weekends and weekdays (P=0.87) or between night-time and daytime (P=0.21).

Two studies into paediatric ICUs have been carried out. In 2005, Hixson et al., in a US study of 5968 patients admitted to paediatric ICU, found neither weekend admission (p=0.15), weekend discharge/death (p=0.35), nor evening PICU admission (p=0.71) showed a significant relationship with mortality. Fendler et al., in 2012, in a study of 2240 Polish paediatric ICU patients, found mortality was 10.9% and did not differ depending on weekend or weekday admission (10.95% vs 10.86% respectively, p=0.96).

=== Other non-selected patients ===
Schilling et al., in 2010, investigated 166,920 patients admitted to 39 Michigan hospitals. Participants were adults, 65 years+, and admitted through the emergency department with six common discharge diagnoses (acute myocardial infarction, congestive heart failure, stroke, pneumonia, hip fracture, gastrointestinal bleeding). Seasonal influenza conferred the greatest increase in absolute risk of in-hospital mortality (0.5%; 95% CI 0.23-0.76), followed by weekend admission (0.32%; 95% CI 0.11-0.54), and high hospital occupancy on admission (0.25; 95% CI 0.06-0.43).

In a huge study in 2012 by Freemantle et al., 14,217,640 admissions (all types) were assessed. Admission on weekend days was associated with an increase in risk of subsequent death compared with admission on weekdays. Hazard ratio for Sunday vs Wednesday 1.16 (95% CI 1.14-1.18; p<0.0001), and for Saturday vs Wednesday 1.11 (95% CI 1.09-1.13; p<.0001). Also in 2012, Lee et al., in Malaysia, studied 126,627 patients admitted to a single hospital. The group found that there was a statistically significant increased risk of mortality for those patients admitted during weekends (OR = 1.22; 95% CI 1.14-1.31) and out-of-hours on a weekday (OR = 1.67; 95% CI 1.57-1.78). As well as the effect of the weekend, there is a considerable literature on the effect of being admitted 'out-of-hours'. This effect is seen during the week and at weekends. This study by Lee is such a paper. The degree of effect is usually higher for the 'Out-of-Hours Effect' rather than the 'Weekend Effect'. This suggests that the 'weekend effect' may be nothing to do with the weekend per se, but may be caused by varying staff levels, and less intensive working practices, outside the '9-5 window'.

Ruiz et al., in 2015, researched 28 hospitals in England, Australia, US and the Netherlands; including both emergency and surgical-elective patients. This was an important study as it compared different healthcare systems throughout the developed world. They examined 2,982,570 hospital records. Adjusted odds of 30-day death were higher for weekend emergency admissions to 11 hospitals in England (OR = 1.08; 95% CI 1.04-1.13 on Sunday), 5 hospitals in US (OR = 1.13, 95% CI 1.04-1.24 on Sunday) and 6 hospitals in the Netherlands (OR = 1.20; 95% CI 1.09-1.33). Emergency admissions to the six Australian hospitals showed no daily variation in adjusted 30-day mortality, but showed a weekend effect at 7 days post emergency admission (OR = 1.12; 95% CI 1.04-1.22 on Saturday). All weekend elective patients showed higher adjusted odds of 30-day postoperative death; observing a 'Friday effect' for elective patients in the six Dutch hospitals. It seems that the 'weekend effect' is a phenomenon seen around the developed world.

Conway et al., in a 2016 Irish study of 30,794 weekend admissions (in 16,665 patients) found that the admission rate was substantially higher for more deprived areas, 12.7 per 1000 (95% CI 9.4-14.7) vs 4.6 per 1000 (95% CI 3.3-5.8).

Also in 2016, in the UK, Aldridge et al. surveyed 34,350 clinicians. They found substantially fewer specialists were present providing care to emergency admissions on Sunday (1667, 11%) than on Wednesday (6105, 42%). The Sunday-to-Wednesday intensity ratio was less than 0.7 in 104 (90%) of the contributing trusts. Mortality risk among patients admitted at weekends was higher than among those admitted on weekdays (OR = 1.10; 95% CI 1.08-1.11; p<0.0001). There was no significant association between Sunday-to-Wednesday specialist intensity ratios and weekend to weekday mortality ratios (r = -0.042; p=0.654).

Cardiac arrest In 2008, in the US, Pederby et al. investigated 58,593 cases of in-hospital cardiac arrest. Among in-hospital cardiac arrests occurring during day/evening hours, survival was higher on weekdays (20.6%; 95% CI 20.3%-21%) than on weekends (17.4%; 95% CI 16.8%-18%); odds ratio was 1.15 (95% CI 1.09-1.22). Day of week was not the only determinant of survival. Rates of survival to discharge was substantially lower during the night compared with day/evening; 14.7% (95% CI 14.3%-15.1%) vs 19.8% (95% CI 19.5%-20.1%). The authors concluded "survival rates from in-hospital cardiac arrest are lower during nights and weekends, even when adjusted for potentially confounding patient, event, and hospital characteristics".

In Japan, in 2011, Kioke et al., studied 173,137 cases of out-of-hospital cardiac arrest (OHCA). No significant differences were found between weekday and weekend/holiday cases, with odds ratios of 1.00 (95% CI 0.96-1.04; p=0.96) for 1-month survival and 0.99 (95% CI 0.94-1.04; p=0.78) for neurologically favourable 1-month survival.

In a study in 2015, Robinson et al., in the UK, analysed 27,700 patients who had had a cardiac arrest, in 146 UK acute hospitals. Risk-adjusted mortality was worse (p<0.001) for both weekend daytime (OR = 0.72; 95% CI 0.64-80), and night-time (OR = 0.58; 95 CI 0.54-0.63) compared with weekday daytime. In a much smaller study, also in 2015, Lee et al. studied 200 patients in South Korea. Rates of survival to discharge were higher with weekday care than with weekend care (35.8% vs 21.5%, p=0.041). Furthermore, complication rates were higher on the weekend than on the weekday, including cannulation site bleeding (3.0% vs 10.8%, p = 0.041), limb ischaemia (5.9% vs 15.6%, p = 0.026), and procedure-related infections (0.7% vs 9.2%, p = 0.005).

Psychiatry Patients Orellana et al., in Brazil, in 2013, investigated suicide amongst indigenous peoples of the state of Amazonas. They observed that most of the suicides has occurred among men, aged between 15 – 24 years, at home and during the weekend.

In a psychiatry study in the UK, in 2016, Patel et al. studied 7303 weekend admissions. Patients admitted at the weekend were more likely to present via acute hospital services, other psychiatric hospitals and the criminal justice system than to be admitted directly from their own home. Weekend admission was associated with a shorter duration of admission (B-coefficient -21.1 days, 95% CI -24.6-717.6, p<0.001) and an increased risk of readmission in the 12 months following index admission (incidence rate ratio 1.13, 95% CI 1.08-1.18, p<0.001); but in-patient mortality (OR = 0.79; 95% CI 0.51-0.23; p= 0.30) was not greater than for weekday admission.

Other studies In a palliative care study in Germany, Voltz et al. (2015) studied 2565 admitted patients - 1325 deaths were recorded. Of the deaths, 448 (33.8%) occurred on weekends and public holidays. The mortality rate on weekends and public holidays was 18% higher than that on working days (OR = 1.18; 95% CI 1.05-1.32; p=0.005). They concluded "Patients in the palliative care unit were at higher risk of dying on weekends and public holidays. In the absence of a prospective study, the exact reasons for this correlation are unclear." So, even in a situation where all the patients studied are dying, there is a weekend death effect, perhaps relating to differing work patterns.

In summary, there is strong evidence of a weekend effect when large non-disease specific groups of unselected patients are studied; both medical, surgical (both elective and non-elective patients) and ED. Patients who have had a cardiac arrest, or are palliative, also show the effect. There is variable evidence of an effect in ICU patients, adult and paediatric; also with variable evidence in psychiatry admissions.

== Published research: Disease-specific (selected) patients: Cardiorespiratory medicine ==
=== Cardiology ===
AMI Multiple studies have been carried out into acute myocardial infarction (AMI). In the first study, in Japan in 2007, Matsui et al. studied 6084 patients. There were no differences between the weekday and weekend groups in terms of in-hospital, 30-day, and 1-year mortality rates.

However, also in 2007, in a much larger US study (of 231,164 AMI patients), Kostis et al. found that the difference in mortality at 30 days was significant even after adjustment for demographic characteristics, coexisting conditions, and site of infarction (OR = 1.048; 95% CI 1.02-1.08; p<0.001).

In 2008, Kruth et al. in Germany, analysed 11,516 patients with ST-elevation myocardial infarction (STEMI). On weekends the group found a significantly higher in-hospital mortality (11.1 vs 9.4%, p=0.01) and at night there was a trend to higher in-hospital mortality when compared with regular working hours (10.6 vs 9.4%, p=0.07).

In small Japanese study, two years later, 370 AMI patients were studied (Turin et al., 2009). Odds ratio was 1.18 (95% CI 0.7-1.9) but there was no significant difference between weekend and weekday patients. Similarly, also in 2010, in South Korea, in another large study (97,466 patients), Hong el al, found the 30-day fatality rate was insignificantly different after adjustment for medical or invasive management (OR = 1.05; 95% CI 0.99-1.11).

Similarly, in 2012, in a study of 4616 AMI patients in Middle Eastern Countries, Al-Lawati et al. found no significant differences in 1-month (OR = 0.88; 95% CI 0.68-1.14) and 1-year mortality (OR = 0.88; 95% CI 0.70-1.10), respectively, between weekday and weekend admissions.

In the following year, 2013, five studies were published; three showed a weekend effect, two (smaller studies) did not. In Denmark, Hansen et al. studied 92,164 AMI patients. Mortality rates were higher on weekends within seven days of admission in 1997-99 (absolute difference ranging from 0.8 to 1.1%), with weekend-weekday hazard-ratios of 1.13 (95% CI 1.03-1.23) at day 2 and 1.10 (95% CI 1.01-1.18) at day 7. But there were no significant differences in 2000-09 and suggesting an attenuation of the initial 'weekend-effect', perhaps relating to more equitable care. Khera et al., in the US, carried out another huge study, of 1,434,579 patients with a STEMI. Weekend admission and multivessel PCI were independent predictors of in-hospital mortality among patients who underwent PCI for STEMI. Gyenes et al., in Canada, studied 6711 NSTEMI patients. Weekend admission was independently associated with higher mortality (OR = 1.52; 95% CI 1.15-2.01; p=0.004).

Rahthod et al., in the UK, studied 3347 STEMI patients, but did not find a weekend effect. In hospital mortality rates were comparable between the weekday and weekend groups (3.6% vs 3.2%) with day of presentation not predictive of outcome (OR = 1.25; 95% CI 0.74-2.11). In another small UK study in 2013, Showkathali et al., investigated 1471 STEMI patients and found a similar result. In-hospital mortality, 30-day mortality, and 1-year mortality were not different between weekday and weekend groups.

In 2014, in another Canadian study (of 11,981 AMI patients), O'Neill et al. found that, after adjusting for baseline risk factors, the hazards ratio for mortality was non-significant (OR = 1.06; 95% CI 0.82-1.38). Mortality at 1 year was also similar. Conversely, in the following year, in another Japanese study (of 111,200 patients, i.e. much larger than the previous two Japanese studies), Isogai et al., found in-hospital mortality was significantly higher for weekend admission, compared to weekday admission (13.6% vs 11.4%; p<0.001; OR = 1.22; 95% CI 1.17-1.27), despite the higher rate of PCI performed on the day of admission (68.9% vs 64.8%; p<0.001).

In South Korea in 2015, Kim et al., investigated 577 patients with NSTEMI or ACS. After adjustment for all confounding factors, weekend admission was associated with a 2.1-fold increased hazard for major adverse cardiac event (MACE), including cardiac death (OR = 2.13; 95% CI 1.26-3.60; p=0.005).

In 2016, in a huge American study by Khoshchehreh et al., of 13,988,772 patients with Acute Coronary Syndrome (ACS), adjusted mortality was higher for weekend admissions for Non-ST-Elevation Acute Coronary Syndromes (OR = 1.15, 95% CI 1.14-1.16); but only somewhat higher for ST-Elevation Myocardial Infarction (OR = 1.03; 95% CI 1.01-1.04). Additionally, patients were significantly less likely to receive coronary revascularisation intervention/therapy on their first day of admission; OR = 0.97 (95% CI 0.96-0.98) and OR = 0.75 (95% CI 0.75-0.75) for STEMI and NSTEMI respectively.

In another huge US study, also in 2016, 3,625,271 NSTEMI admissions were identified by Agrawal et al. Admission on a weekend vs weekday was independently associated with a lower rate of coronary angiography (OR = 0.88; 95% CI 0.89-0.90; p<0.001). And adjusted in-hospital mortality was significantly higher for the cohort of patients admitted on weekends (OR = 1.02; 95% CI 1.01-1.04; p<0.001).

PCI Noman et al., in the UK in 2012, studied 2571 consecutive PCI-treated STEMI patients. There was no difference in mortality between weekday and weekend groups (OR = 1.09, 95% CI 0.82-1.46; p=0.57). Similarly, no increase in mortality was seen in patients who underwent PCI at night (22:00-06:00).

Whereas, in 2015, Singh et al., in the US, carried out a much larger study of 401,571 PCI procedures. In a multivariate analysis, the weekend was a significant predictor of mortality.

Patel et al., in the US in 2016, studied 4,376,950 patients who underwent PCI, focussing on a complication, upper GI bleed (UGIB). The incidence of UGIB was 1.1%. Mortality rate in the UGIB group was significantly higher (9.71% vs 1.1%, p <0.0001). They also found a higher risk of UGIB in urgent versus elective admissions, and weekend versus weekday admissions.

=== Other cardiac disease ===
Three studies have been carried out into Acute Heart Failure (AHF). In 2009, in a US study of 48,612 patients with AHF, there were no differences in death rate by day of admission or discharge (Fornarow et al.). Conversely, in the same year, also in the US, Horwich et al. analysed 81,810 AHF admissions at 241 sites. Weekend AHF admission compared to weekday admission was associated with an increased in-hospital mortality (OR = 1.13; 95% CI 1.02-1.27). In a smaller Japanese study (of 1620 patients) in 2014, Hamaguchi et al., found in-hospital death was comparable between patients admitted on the weekend and weekdays (OR = 1.13; 95% CI 1.63-2.00; p=0.69).

Deshmukh et al., in the US in 2012, analysed 86,497 discharges with atrial fibrillation. The rate of AF requiring cardioversion was lower at the weekend when compared to a weekday (7.9% vs 16.2%, p<0.0001; OR = 0.5, 95% CI 0.45-0.55; p<0.0001). The adjusted hospital mortality odds was greater for weekend admissions (OR = 1.23, 95% CI 1.03-1.51; p<0.0001), after adjusting for patient and hospital characteristics and disease severity.

=== Cardiovascular surgery ===
There have been three studies in cardiovascular surgery. In 2011, Kim et al. in the US, studied 97, 563 congenital heart surgery admissions to pediatric hospitals. Multivariable analysis demonstrated higher case complexity for weekend admission (OR = 2.6; p<0.001). No mortality data was presented.

Badheka et al., in the US, in 2014, studied 2127 patients who had had percutaneous aortic balloon valvotomy. Significant predictors of in-hospital mortality were the presence of increasing comorbidities (p=0.03), unstable patient (P<0.001), any complication (p<0.001), and weekend admission (p=0.008).

In 2016, in the US, Gonzalez et al. studied 176 paediatric patients placed on extracorporeal life support (ECLS). The most common indications for ECLS were congenital diaphragmatic hernia (33%) and persistent pulmonary hypertension (23%). When comparing 'in-hours' (40%) to 'out-off-hours' cannulation (60%), there were no significant differences in central nervous system complications, haemorrhage (extra-cranial), cannula repositioning, conversion from venovenous to venoarterial, mortality on ECLS, or survival-to-discharge.

In summary, in AMI and PCI (in the larger studies), and AF, there is good evidence of a weekend effect. AMI is a condition where a weekend effect might not have been predicted (i.e. a fairly random acute disease, traditionally looked after on a CCU where working patterns are usually similar through the week). In AHF, and Cardiothoracic Surgery, there is variable evidence of a weekend effect.

=== Respiratory medicine ===
COPD There have been four studies in COPD (one including pneumonia), three on PE and two on pneumonia alone. In 2011, in a study of 9,915 admissions in the UK with an acute exacerbation of COPD, Brims et al. found that the adjusted odds ratio for death on day 1 after winter weekend admission was 2.89 (95% CI 1.04-8.08). But after opening a Medical Admission Unit, the OR for death day 1 after weekend winter admission fell from 3.63 (95% CI 1.15-11.5) to 1.65 (95% CI 0.14-19.01).

In the following year, in a much larger study (of 289,077 COPD patients), in Spain, Barba et al. discovered weekend admissions were associated with a significantly higher in-hospital mortality (12.9%) than weekday admissions (12.1%) (OR = 1.07; 95% CI 1.04-1.10). In 2014, in Canada, Suissa et al. published another very large study (of 323,895 patients) with COPD and pneumonia. They found mortality was higher for weekend (OR = 1.06; 95% CI 1.03-1.09) but not Friday admissions (OR = 0.97; 95% CI 0.95-1.00), relative to Monday-Thursday admissions.

In a US study of 25,301 COPD patients (Rinne et al., 2015), there were significantly fewer discharges on the weekend (1922 per weekend day vs 4279 per weekday, p<0.01); weekend discharges were significantly associated with lower odds of mortality within 30 days after discharge (OR = 0.80; 95% CI 0.65-0.99).

Pulmonary embolus Three first studies in Pulmonary Embolus (PE) have been carried out. The first was published by Aujesky in 2009, concerning 15,531 patients with PE in Switzerland. Patients admitted on weekends had a higher unadjusted 30-day mortality rate (11.1% vs 8.8%) than patients admitted on weekdays, with no difference in length of stay. Patients admitted on weekends had significantly greater adjusted odds of dying (OR = 1.17, 95% CI 1.03-1.34) than patients admitted on weekdays. Then Gallerani et al. in 2011, studied 26,560 Italian patients with PE. Weekend admissions were associated with significantly higher rates of in-hospital mortality than weekday admissions (28% vs. 24.8%) (p<0.001). The third study, by Nanchal et al. was carried out a year later, in the US, and was a huge one (of 1,143,707 patients). The authors found unadjusted mortality was higher for weekend admissions than weekday admissions (OR = 1.19; 95% CI 1.13-1.24). This increase in mortality remained statistically significant after controlling for potential confounding variables (OR = 1.17; 95% CI 1.11-1.22).

Pneumonia There are two studies concerning pneumonia. Firstly, in Taiwan, in 2012, Chang et al. described 788,011 patients. The patients admitted on weekends had a 3% higher odds of 30-day death compared with those admitted on weekdays (OR = 1.03; 95% CI 1.01-1.05). Secondly, in Japan, in 2016, Uematsu et al. studied 23,532 patients. After adjusting for baseline patient severity and need for urgent care, weekend admissions were associated with higher mortality (OR = 1.10; 95% CI 1.02-1.19).

In summary, there is good evidence of a weekend effect in a spectrum of respiratory disease, including COPD, PE and pneumonia.

== Published research: Disease-specific (selected) patients: Gastroenterology, nephrology and other medical specialties ==
=== Gastroenterology ===
Upper GI Bleed The studies related to Upper GI Bleed (UGIB) are almost as numerous as those on myocardial infarction; two focus on Acute Variceal Hemorrhage (AVH) alone. In 2009, in the US, Shaheen et al., found, in a study of 237,412 patients with UGI bleed, that those admitted on the weekend had an increased risk of death (3.4% vs 3.0%; OR = 1.08; 95% CI 1.02-1.15). In a similar US paper that year, Ananthakrishnan et al., studied another very large population (of 419,939 patients with UGIB). On multivariate analysis, non-variceal UGIB patients admitted on weekends had higher adjusted in-hospital mortality (OR = 1.21; 95% CI 1.09-1.35). Whereas, weekend admission was not predictive of in-hospital mortality in patients with AVH (OR = 0.94; 95% CI 0.75-1.18).

In another similar US study, by Dorn et al., in 2010, 98,975 patients with UGIB were studied, and a similar weekend effect found. Compared to patients admitted on a weekday, for those admitted on a weekend, in-hospital mortality was higher (unadjusted mortality 3.76 vs 3.33%; p = 0.003; adjusted OR = 1.09, 95% CI 1.00-1.18). Whereas, in a much smaller 2011 UK study (of 6749 patients), Jaraith et al., no weekend effect was found in UGIB. After adjustment for confounders, there was no evidence of a difference between weekend and weekday mortality (OR = 0.93; 95% CI 0.75-1.16).

Two further small studies were published in 2012. In South Korea, 388 UGIB (due to peptic ulcer) patients were studied by Youn et al. Most patients (97%) had undergone early endoscopy, but the mortality rate was not different between the two groups (1.8% overall vs 1.6% on the weekend). Whereas, in the Netherlands, de Groot et al., studied 571 patients with UGIB. The group found patients admitted during the weekend had a higher mortality rate than patients admitted during the week (9% vs 3%; OR = 2.68; 95% CI 1.07-6.72).

In 2014, Abougergi et al., in another very large US study (of 202,340 patients) found that (compared with patients admitted on weekdays), patients with non-variceal UGIB admitted on weekends had similar adjusted in-hospital mortality rates (OR = 1.11; 95% CI 0.93-1.30).

In a Scottish study of 60,643 patients with UGIB in 2015, there was no significant change in annual number of admissions over time; but there was a statistically significant reduction in 30-day case fatality from 10.3% to 8.8% (p<0.001) over 10 years (Ahmed et al.). Patients admitted with UGIB at weekends had a higher 30-day case fatality compared with those admitted on weekdays (p<0.001), after adjusting for comorbidities.

In 2016, Serrao et al., in the US, studied 85,971 patients with bleeding gastroduodenal angiodysplasia (GIAD). Mortality rates were higher for patients with weekend admission (2% vs 1%, p=0 .0002). And the adjusted odds ratio for inpatient mortality associated with weekend admission was elevated (OR = 2.4; 95% CI 1.5-3.9; p=0.0005)

Also in 2016, Weeda et al. in the US, studied 119,353 patients in a metanalysis (of five studies, including their own. They found weekend admission for nonvariceal UGIB was associated with an increased odds of mortality (OR = 1.09; 95% CI 1.04-1.15).

UGIB (Variceal haemorrhage alone) In a Canadian study of 36,734 patients with AVH alone, Myers et al. (2009—after adjusting for confounding factors, including the timing of endoscopy - found that the risk of mortality was similar between weekend and weekday admissions (OR = 1.05; 95% CI 0.97-1.14). Similarly, in a much smaller South Korean study (of 294 AVH patients), Byun et al. (2012), found no weekend effect; when seventeen (23.0%) of 74 patients with a weekend admission and 48 (21.8%) of 220 with a weekday admission died during hospitalisation (p=0.872).

Other Gastroenterological Disease In 2016, in the US, Gaeteno et al. investigated 31,614 with cirrhosis and ascites. Among these admissions, approximately 51% (16,133) underwent paracentesis. Patients admitted on a weekend demonstrated less frequent use of early paracentesis (50% weekend vs 62% weekday) and increased mortality (OR = 1.12; 95% CI 1.01-1.25).

Two US studies of acute cholangitis were also published in 2016. Firstly, Inamdar et al. identified 23,661 patients who were admitted for cholangitis who required ERCP; of which 18,106 (76.5%) patients were admitted on the weekday, and 5,555 (23.5%) admitted on the weekend. By 24h, the weekday group had undergone ERCP more frequently than the weekend group (54.6 vs 43%; p<0.001). There was no statistical difference between the groups for in-hospital all-cause mortality (2.86 vs 2.56%; p=0.24), or length of stay (6.97 days vs 6.88 days; p=0.28). Secondly, in a much smaller study (of 181 patients), Tabibian et al. found no significant differences in mortality between weekend and weekday admission groups.

In a Japanese study, also in 2016, Hamada et al., studied 8328 patients hospitalised with severe acute pancreatitis. In-hospital mortality rates were not significantly different: 5.9% vs 5.4% for weekend and weekday admissions, respectively (OR = 1.06; 95% CI 0.83-1.35).

In summary, there is reasonable evidence (from larger studies) of a 'weekend effect' in UGIB (including bleeding gastroduodenal angiodysplasia) and paracentesis for cirrhosis and ascites; but little effect in AVH alone, and none in ERCP for cholangitis, or pancreatitis.

=== Nephrology and transplantation ===
In a very large Canadian study (of 963,730) patients, in 2010, James et al., showed that (compared with admission on a weekday), AKI patients admitted on a weekend had a higher risk of death (OR = 1.07; 95% CI 1.02-1.12). Similarly, in a huge study of 3,278,572 American haemodialysis patients in 2013, Sakhuja et al., concluded that patients admitted over weekends had higher mortality during the first 3 days of admission (OR = 1.18; 95% CI 1.10-1.26).

Haddock et al., in the UK, in 2015, studied admissions to a renal unit. No weekend effect was observed. Thirty-day mortality rate was 46/208 = 0.22 deaths/weekend day of admission compared with 107/523 = 0.20 deaths/weekday of admission (OR = 1.08, p = 0.67). Acute kidney injury and haemodialysis patients formed a higher percentage of admissions.

Orman et al., in 2012, in the US, studied 94,768 liver transplants. The patient survival rates did not significantly differ from those for daytime and weekday operations. The graft failure rate was unchanged at 30 and 90 days for weekend transplants but was modestly increased at 365 days (OR = 1.05; 95% CI 1.01-1.11).

In 2016, an American study of 181,799 deceased donor kidneys was carried out by Mohan et al. They found that organs procured on weekends, when compared with weekday kidneys, were significantly more likely to be discarded than transplanted (OR = 1.16; 95% CI 1.13–1.19). This was even after adjusting for organ quality (adjusted OR = 1.13; 95% CI 1.10–1.17). Of concern, was that the kidneys discarded at the weekend, were of a significantly higher quality than weekday discards (Kidney Donor Profile Index: 76.5% vs 77.3%).

In another study in 2016, Anderson et al., in the UK, studied 12,902 deceased-donor kidney alone transplants performed in 19 English transplant centres. In a Cox regression model, transplantation at the weekend was not associated with increased 1 year mortality, rehospitalisation or allograft failure/rejection.

In summary, in nephrology, and in aspects of renal and liver transplantation (not mortality), a weekend effect is (variably)seen. This is surprising as both renal and liver medicine usually do not vary clinical practice through the weekend.

=== Haematology-oncology and other medical specialties ===
In a small study of 422 patients in 2010 with Acute Myeloid Leukaemia, also in the US, Bejanyan et al. did not see a difference in mortality based on day of admission. Similarly, in a much larger US study (of 12,043 patients with acute leukaemia), in 2014, Goodman et al. found that those admitted on the weekend did not have an increased mortality (OR = 1.0; 95% CI 0.8-1.6).

Conversely, in a large study (534,011) of US patients with metastatic carcinoma of the prostate also in 2014, Schimd et al. did show a weekend effect. In multivariate analysis, weekend admission was associated with an increased likelihood of complications (OR = 1.15, 95% CI 1.11-1.19) and mortality (OR = 1.20; 95% CI 1.14- 1.27).

Lapointe-Shaw et al., in Canada in 2016, studied 290,471 hospital admissions with cancer. Patients admitted to hospital on weekends/holidays had an increased 7-day in-hospital mortality (4.8% vs 4.3%; OR = 1.13; 95% CI 1.08-1.17); corresponding to 137 excess deaths per year compared with the weekday group. Among those who had procedures in the first 4 days of admission, fewer weekend/holiday-admitted patients had them performed in the first 2 days, for 8 of 9 common procedure groups.

In 2013, Wichmann et al. in a Danish study of 4762 episodes of opiate overdose, found age >50 years and overdose during the weekend significantly associated with 48h mortality.

In summary, in haematology and oncology, two out of three studies showed the weekend effect, both on >100,000 patients.

== Published research: Disease-specific (selected) patients: neuroscience ==
=== Neurology ===
Stroke With myocardial infarction and UGIB, the most well studied disease is stroke, with varying results regarding the weekend effect. Though there are three very large studies (>100,000 patients), two of which are positive.

In the first stroke study, by Saposnik et al. in 2007, 26,676 patients in 606 hospitals in Canada were assessed. Seven-day stroke mortality was 7.6%. Weekend admissions were associated with a higher stroke mortality than weekday admissions (8.5% vs 7.4%). In the multivariable analysis, weekend admissions were associated with higher early mortality (OR = 1.14; 95% CI 1.02-1.26) after adjusting for age, sex, comorbidities, and medical complications.

In Japan in the following year, a much smaller study of 1578 patients, was carried out by Turin et al. They found the 28-day case fatality rate for the weekend admission group was 14.7% (95% CI 11.3-18.8) and 10.1% (95% CI 8.5-11.9) for the weekday admission group. This phenomenon was observed mainly for cerebral infarction, and to some extent for cerebral haemorrhage. But it did not reach statistical significance. In 2009, Tung et al., in Taiwan, studied 34,347 ischaemic stroke patients and found that weekend admissions were associated with increased 30-day mortality.

Five studies were published in 2010; three showed a weekend effect. Kazley et al., in a US study of 78,657 patients, found no significant difference in mortality depending on day of admission. Similarly, in a larger US study (of 599,087 patients), Hoh et al., also found no difference in in-hospital mortality. Whereas Fang et al., in a Canadian study of 20,657 patients, reported that the all-cause 7-day fatality rate was higher in patients seen on weekends compared to weekdays (8.1% vs 7.0%), even after adjustment for age, sex, stroke severity, and comorbid conditions (OR = 1.12, 95% CI 1.00-1.25). Smith et al. carried out another (much larger) Canadian study with 1036 hospitals contributing 274,988 ischaemic stroke patients. Characteristics associated with in-hospital mortality were age, arrival mode (e.g., via ambulance vs other mode), history of atrial fibrillation, previous stroke, previous myocardial infarction, carotid stenosis, diabetes mellitus, peripheral vascular disease, hypertension, history of dyslipidemia, current smoking, and weekend or night admission. In the Netherlands, Ogbu et al., studied 82,219 ischaemic stroke admissions to 115 hospitals. A higher 7-day death risk for weekend admission, when compared to weekday admission, was seen (OR = 1.27; 95% CI 1.20-1.34).

In 2011, McKinney et al. in the US, studied a much larger number of patients (134,441). Ninety-day mortality was greater in patients with stroke admitted on weekends compared with weekdays (17.2% vs 16.5%; p=0.002). The adjusted risk of death at 90 days was significantly greater for weekend admission (OR = 1.05; 95% CI 1.02-1.09). In a much smaller US study, also in 2011, by O'Brien et al., 929 stroke patients were analysed. The overall risk of 28-day mortality was 9.6% for weekday strokes and 10.1% for weekend strokes. However, in a model controlling for patient demographics, risk factors, and event year, weekend arrival was not associated with 28-day mortality (OR = 0.87; 95% CI 0.51-1.50).

Three studies were published in 2012; two showed a weekend effect. Firstly, Palmer et al., in a study of 93,621 UK patients, found the rate of 7-day in-hospital mortality for Sunday admissions was 11.0% (OR = 1.26; 95% CI 1.16-1.37; with Monday used as a reference) compared with a mean of 8.9% for weekday admissions. Secondly, Albright et al., in a study of 8581 patients in the US, reported that weekend admission was not a significant independent predictor of in-hospital mortality (8.4 vs 9.9%, p=0.056), or 90-day mortality (18.2 vs 19.8%, p=0.680). Thirdly, in a Polish study, Niewada et al., studied 19,667 ischaemic stroke patients, in 72 stroke centres. More patients admitted on weekends died during hospitalisation or had poor outcome at discharge than weekday patients (15.9% and 59.8% vs. 14.1% and 55.3%, respectively).

In 2013 in France, Béjot et al., in a study of 5864 patients, found that onset during weekends/bank holidays was associated with a higher risk of 30-day mortality during 1985-2003 (OR = 1.26; 95% CI 1.06-1.51; p=0.01), but not during 2004-2010 (OR = 0.99; 95% CI 0.69-1.43; p=0.97). The authors concluded "The deleterious effect of weekends/bank holidays on early stroke mortality disappeared after the organization of a dedicated stroke care network in our community".

In 2014, Bray et al., in the UK, studied 56,666 patients in 103 stroke units. The authors found that the highest risk of death was observed in stroke services with the lowest nurse/bed ratios. In multivariable analysis, patients admitted on a weekend to a stroke unit with 1.5 nurses/ten beds had an estimated adjusted 30-d mortality risk of 15.2% (OR = 1.18, 95% CI 1.07-1.29) compared to 11.2% for patients admitted to a unit with 3.0 nurses/ten beds (OR = 0.85, 95% CI 0.77-0.93). The presence of specialist stroke physicians doing daily ward rounds did not have a significant effect on mortality.

Three studies in stroke were published in 2015, one which showed a weekend effect. In the largest study, 47,885 Japanese stroke patients were included (Inoue et al.). Of these patients, 32.0% were admitted to a Stroke ICU and 27.8% were admitted to a general medical ward (GMW) on a weekend. The estimated in-hospital mortality rate was significantly higher among the patients admitted to a GMW on a weekend compared with those admitted on a weekday (7.9% vs 7.0%), but this difference was not significant after adjusting for the patients' background characteristics. The estimated in-hospital mortality rates of the patients admitted to an S-ICU were similar between weekend and weekday admissions (10.0% vs 9.9%). In a UK stroke study of 37,888 patients, it was found that when compared with weekdays, mortality at seven days was increased significantly; by 19% for admissions on weekends—although the admission rate was 21% lower on weekends (Roberts et al.). Although not significant, there were indications of increased mortality at seven days for weekend admissions during winter months (31%), in the community (81%) rather than large hospitals (8%) and for patients resident furthest from hospital (32% for distances of >20 kilometres). In a much smaller Spanish study, 1250 patients were described; and no difference was found in in-hospital mortality (Romero Sevilla et al.). Regarding functional outcome at 3 months, 67.0% of weekday vs 60.7% of weekend admissions were independent (p=0.096); as were 65.5% of patients admitted during the academic months vs 3.5% of those admitted during summer holidays (p=0.803). They also identified a trend toward higher rates of thrombolysis administration on weekdays, during the morning shift, and during the academic months.

Four studies have, so far, been published in 2016; three showing a weekend effect, one not. Turner et al., in the UK, investigated 52,276 stroke events. OR for seven-day mortality, 30-day mortality and 30-day discharge for weekend admission compared to weekday was 1.17 (95% CI 1.05-1.30), 1.08 (95% CI 1.00 to 1.17) and 0.90 (95% CI 0.85 to 0.95), respectively. A smaller Korean study (of 8957 stroke patients) by Cho et al., also found evidence of an effect. After adjusting for patient and hospital characteristics, their frailty model analysis revealed significantly higher in-hospital mortality in patients admitted on weekends than in those admitted on weekdays (OR = 1.22; 95% CI 1.01-1.47).

Hsieh et al., in Taiwan, analysed 46,007 ischaemic stroke admissions. They found, in multivariate analysis without adjustment for stroke severity, weekend admission was associated with increased 30-day mortality (OR = 1.20; 95% CI 1.08-1.34). But this association did not persist after adjustment for stroke severity (OR = 1.07; 95% CI 0.95-1.20). Whereas, Ansa et al., in Nigeria in 2016, studied 339 patients, of which 187 (55.2%) had had a stroke. They found presentation to hospital after-hours was a significant predictor of death (OR = 3.37).

There has been one study of stroke in (8467) children, by Adil et al., in the US, in 2016. After adjusting for age, sex, and confounders, the odds of in-hospital mortality remained higher among children admitted on weekends (OR = 1.4; 95% CI 1.1-1.9; p=0.04).

Other neurological disease One study related to meningococcal septicaemia has been published. In 2013, Goldacre et al., in a UK study of 19,729 patients, found that the risk of in-hospital death was significantly higher (OR = 1.12; 95% CI 1.05-1.20) for weekend admission.

=== Neurosurgery ===
Intracranial haemorrhage Several studies have been published regarding intracranial bleeding: intracerebral, subarachnoid and subdural haemorrhage. In 2009 in the US, Crowley et al., in a study of 13,821 US patients with intracerebral haemorrhage (ICH), reported the risk of in-hospital death was 12% higher with weekend admission (OR = 1.12; 95% CI 1.05-1.20). In China, in 2012, Jiang et al., in a much smaller study (of 313 patients with ICH) found that weekend admission was not a statistically significant predictive factor of in-hospital mortality (p=0.315) or functional outcome (p=0.128). However, in 2016, Patel et al., also in the US, studied 485,329 patients with intracerebral haemorrhage (ICH). Overall, weekend admission was associated with 11% higher odds of in-hospital mortality. When analysed in 3-year groups, excess mortality of weekend admissions showed temporal decline.

Three relatively small studies on SAH have been carried out. Crowley et al., in the US in 2009, investigated patients with subarachnoid haemorrhage (SAH; 5667 patients). Unlike the group's other study, weekend admission was not a statistically significant independent predictor of death in the study population at 7 days (OR = 1.07, 95% CI 0.91-1.25), 14 days (OR = 1.01, 95% CI 0.87-1.17), or 30 days (OR = 1.03, 95% CI 0.89-1.19). In 2011, in China, Zhang et al., in a smaller study, analysed 183 patients with SAH. In logistic regression model, weekend admission was not an independent predictor of higher in-hospital mortality (OR = 1.77, 95% CI 0.83-3.77) after SAH. However a weekend effect was observed by Deshmukh et al., in 2016, when the group studied 385 UK patients with SAH. They found that the patients admitted on a weekend had a significantly higher scan to treatment time (83.1 ± 83.4 h vs 40.4 ± 53.4 h, p<0.0001) and admission to treatment (71.6 ± 79.8 h vs 27.5 ± 44.3 h, p < 0.0001) time. After adjustments for adjusted for relevant covariates, weekend admission was significantly associated with excess in-hospital mortality (OR = 2.1, 95% CI 1.13-4.0; p = 0.01).

In 2013, Busi et al., investigated 14,093 US patients with acute non-traumatic subdural haemorrhage. In multivariate analysis, weekend admission (OR = 1.19; 95% CI 1.02-1.38) was an independent predictor of in-hospital mortality.

Similarly, in 2017, Rumalia et al., in an American study of 404,212 patients with traumatic SDH, showed that weekend admission was associated with an increased likelihood of in-hospital complication (OR = 1.06-1.12), prolonged length of stay (OR = 1.08-1.17), and in-hospital mortality (OR: 1.04-1.11).

Other neurosurgical disease In 2012, in the US, Dasenbrook et al., studied 2714 patients with spinal metastases. Weekend admission was associated with a significantly lower adjusted odds of receiving surgery within 1 day (OR = 0.66; 95% CI 0.54-0.81; p<0.001) and within 2 days (OR = 0.68; 95% CI 0.56-0.83; p<0.001) of admission. But the adjusted odds of in-hospital death was not significantly different for those admitted on the weekend.

In 2012, Schneider et al., also in the US, carried out a study of 38,675 patients with traumatic brain injury. Weekend patients demonstrated 14% increased risk of mortality (OR = 1.14; 95% CI 1.05-1.23). However, Nandyala et al., in the following year, in a US study of 34,122 patients who had undergone cervical fusion for cervical spine trauma, found the mortality rate was not significantly different among the weekend patients.

Desai et al., in the US, in 2015, investigated 580 children undergoing emergency neurosurgical procedures. After multivariate analysis, children undergoing procedures during a weekday after hours or weekends were more likely to experience complications (p=0.0227), and had an increased mortality.

In 2016, Tanenbaum et al. in the US, studied 8,189 patients who had had atlantoaxial fusion. Significant predictors of in-hospital mortality included increased age, emergent or urgent admission, weekend admission, congestive heart failure, coagulopathy, depression, electrolyte disorder, metastatic cancer, neurologic disorder, paralysis, and non-bleeding peptic ulcer.

Atenello et al., in 2016, studied 99,472 US paediatric patients with shunted hydrocephalus, 16% of whom were admitted on a weekend. After adjustment for disease severity, time to procedure, and admission acuity, weekend admission was not associated with an increase in the inpatient mortality rate (p=0.46) or a change in the percentage of routine discharges (p=0.98) after ventricular shunt procedures. In addition, associations were unchanged after an evaluation of patients who underwent shunt revision surgery. High-volume centres were incidentally noted in multivariate analysis to have increased rates of routine discharge (OR = 1.04; 95% CI 1.01-1.07; p=0.02).

Also in 2016, Linzey et al., in the US, studied 15, 865 patients. This were all patients undergoing neurosurgery in a single centre (Michigan). Surgical morbidity was more common during weekend cases vs weekday cases (6.60% vs 4.65%, p=0.03). Surgical mortality during weekend cases was 0.87% compared to only 0.20% during weekdays (p<0.001).

In summary, in neuroscience, the evidence is less clear. In stroke, the weekend effect probably exists. Except for two studies (by Kazley et al., and Hoh et al., both in 2010), all the studies over 20,000 patients show the effect. In neurological/surgical conditions that may require surgery, there is variable evidence of a weekend effect.

== Published research: Disease-specific (selected) patients: Paediatrics and obstetrics ==
Neonatal mortality Several paediatric and obstetric studies have been performed. In fact, the first studies on the weekend effect were in this area in the late 1970s.

Possibly the first study of the weekend effect was a UK prospective study of 297,000 children, published in 1977, when childhood deaths were assessed. The paper stated "16 of the 29 sudden unexpected deaths occurred at a weekend or bank holiday".

In 1981, Hendry in the UK, stated that "babies born on Sundays were more at risk of dying during or after birth." Also in 1981, in the US, Mangold studied 66,049 live births. Neonatal mortality was found to be higher among weekend deliveries with a Sunday rate that was 27 per cent above the weekly average. Two years later, in Australia, Mathers concluded that "stillbirth and neonatal death rates were 17% and 29% higher respectively among babies born at weekends than among those born on weekdays".

In 2003, Hamilton et al., in an American study of 111,749 births, found that neonatal mortality was higher among the births on weekends than those during the week. However, in the same year, Gould et al. also in the US, studied 1,615,041 live births. Observed neonatal mortality increased was 2.80/1000 for weekday births and 3.12/1000 for weekend births (OR = 1.12; 95% CI 1.05-1.19; p=0.001). But after adjusting for birth weight, the increased odds of death for infants born on the weekend were no longer significant.

In 2004, Luo et al., studied 3,239,972 births recorded in Canada. The proportion of births on weekend days was 24% lower than the proportion on weekdays. Infants born on weekend days had slightly but significantly elevated risks of stillbirth (OR = 1.06, 95% CI 1.02-1.09) and early neonatal death (OR = 1.11, 95% CI 1.07-1.16). However, the higher risks disappeared after adjustment for gestational age.

Salihu et al., in another American study, in 2012, found that the neonatal mortality rate was higher on weekends (3.25/1000) compared to weekdays (2.87/1000)(p=0.042). In the same year, Ibrahimou et al., in a US study of twin births, found post-neonatal mortality risk was higher on weekends as compared to weekdays (OR = 1.19; 95% CI 1.04-1.36). Also twins born on weekends to teenage mothers (age<18) had a 35% greater risk for neonatal death (OR = 1.35; 95% CI 1.06-1.71.

In 2015, Palmer et al. in the UK carried out an observational study on outcomes from maternal and neonatal records; on 1,332,835 deliveries and 1,349,599 births. They found that performance across four of seven measures was significantly worse for women admitted, and babies born, at weekends. In particular, the perinatal mortality rate was 7.3 per 1000 babies delivered at weekends; 0.9 per 1000 higher than for weekdays (OR = 1.07; 95% CI 1.02-1.13). No consistent association between outcomes and staffing was identified, although trusts that complied with recommended levels of consultant presence had a perineal tear rate of 3.0% compared with 3.3% for non-compliant services (OR = 1.21; 95% CI 1.00-1.45.

The authors went on to make a prediction regarding the possible benefits of removing the 'weekend effect': "The results would suggest approximately 770 perinatal deaths and 470 maternal infections per year above what might be expected if performance was consistent across women admitted, and babies born, on different days of the week."

Other paediatric disease Mitchell et al., in New Zealand in 1988, carried out a small study of Sudden Infant Death Syndrome (SIDS). Examination of deaths by day of the week, and showed the weekend had more deaths than the weekdays (p=0.0002).

Goldstein et al., in 2014, studied 439,457 US paediatric patients who underwent a range of surgical procedures. After multivariate adjustment and regression, patients undergoing a weekend procedure were more likely to die (OR = 1.63; 95% CI 1.21-2.20).

Burstein et al., in a study of 71,180 South African paediatric trauma patients found that 8,815 (12.4%) resulted from Road Traffic Accidents. RTAs were more common on weekends than weekdays (2.98 vs 2.19 patients/day; p<0.001), representing a greater proportion of daily all-cause trauma (15.5% vs 11.2%; p<0.001). Moreover, weekend RTA patients sustained more severe injuries than on weekdays, and compared to weekend all-cause trauma patients (injury score 1.66 vs. 1.46 and 1.43; both p<0.001).

In obstetric and paediatrics, most studies did show a weekend effect. This is a concern as both specialties, traditionally, have similar work patterns throughout the week.

== Published research: Disease-specific (selected) patients: Specialist surgery ==
=== General surgery ===
The weekend effect have been assessed in a wide range of specific surgical conditions. Four studies were published in 2012. Worni et al., in the US, studied 151,774 patients who had had a laparoscopic appendectomy. Overall mortality (OR = 1.37; p=0.075) was not statistically different between weekday and weekend groups. Whereas the same group, found a weekend effect in a study of 31,832 patients who underwent urgent surgery for left-sided diverticulitis (Worni et al., 2012). In a risk-adjusted analysis, patients admitted on weekends had a significantly higher risk for any postoperative complication (OR = 1.10; p=0.005). A mortality analysis was not presented.

In the same year, in a small study of 404 US patients with small bowel obstruction, McVay et al., found that mortality was low at 1.7%, with no difference noted between the groups (p=0.35). This is not surprising with a small study of a lowish risk procedure. In the US, Orman et al., studied 94,768 liver transplant patients. Unadjusted Cox proportional hazards modelling showed that in comparison with weekday liver transplant patients, weekend liver transplant patients had an OR of 0.99 (95% CI 0.93-1.07) for mortality at 30 days (i.e. no weekend effect).

In 2017, Hoehn et al., in the US, studied 50,707 patients who had undergone urgent colectomy. They found, on multivariate analysis, mortality was associated with patient age (10 years: OR = 1.31, p < 0.01), severity of illness (extreme: OR = 34.68, p < 0.01), insurance status (Medicaid: OR = 1.24, p < 0.01; uninsured: OR = 1.40, p < 0.01), and weekend admission (OR = 1.09, p = 0.04).

=== Trauma and orthopaedics ===
In 2011, Carr et al. carried out a study of 90,461 US patients with trauma. The authors found that patients presenting on weekends were less likely to die than patients presenting on weekdays (OR = 0.89; 95% CI 0.81-0.97). This is one of only two studies that have shown weekend mortality is less at the weekend.

There have been four studies looking at fracture of the neck of femur. In 2012, Daugaard et al., carried out a study on 38,020 Danish patients with a fractured neck of femur. The mortality rate for patients admitted during weekends or public holidays, or at night, was similar to that found for those admitted during working days. Whereas, two years later, Thomas et al., in a much smaller UK of 2989 consecutive patients, found that (whether managed surgically or conservatively), patients were more likely to die as an inpatient when admitted at the weekend (OR = 1.4, 95% CI 1.02-1.80; p=0.032).

However, in a US study of 344,989 patients with fractured neck of femur, in 2015, the opposite effect was found (Boylan et al.). Compared with patients admitted on weekdays, patients admitted on weekends had lower mortality (OR = 0.94; 95% CI 0.89-0.99) and shorter mean hospital stay (estimate, 3.74%; 95% CI 3.40-4.08); but did not differ in risk of perioperative complications (OR = 1.00; 95% CI 0.98-1.02). The authors concluded: "our study data do not support a weekend effect among hip fracture admissions in the United States". This is second study where a 'weekday effect' has been found.

In 2016, in Denmark, Kristiansen et al. investigated 25,305 patients undergoing hip fracture surgery. When comparing admission during weekends with admission during weekdays, off-hours admission was associated with a higher risk of surgical delay (OR = 1.19; 95% CI 1.05-1.37) and a higher 30-day mortality risk (OR = 1.13; 95% CI 1.04-1.23). They felt that "The risk of surgical delay appeared not to explain the excess 30-day mortality".

Three studies on major or polytrauma were carried out in 2016. Dei Giudici et al. carried out a small study (of 208 Italian polytrauma patients). No correlation between mortality and orthopaedic surgical timing was found.

Also in 2016, in the UK, Giannoudis et al. studied 1735 patients, and found mortality was lower in the weekend group: 39/360 pts (10.8%) compared to the weekday group: 100/670 pts (14.9%) but this did not reach statistical significance p=0.07). The relative risk (RR) of weekend mortality was 0.726 (95% CI: 0.513-1.027).

In another study on major trauma in 2016, in all 22 UK major trauma centres (MTC), Metcalfe et al., investigated 49,070 patients. Using multivariable logistic regression models, odds of secondary transfer into an MTC were higher at night (OR = 2.05, 95% CI 1.93-2.19) but not during the day at weekends (OR = 1.09; CI 0.99-1.19). Neither admission at night nor at the weekend was associated with increased length of stay, or higher odds of in-hospital death.

=== Vascular surgery ===
Two studies of ruptured abdominal aortic aneurysm (AAA) have been carried out. Both demonstrated the weekend effect. In 2012, Gellerani et al., in Italy, investigated 4461 patients. Weekend admissions were associated with significantly higher in-hospital mortality (43.4%) than weekday admissions (36.9%; p<0.001). Multivariate regression analysis showed that weekend admission was an independent risk factor for increased in-hospital mortality (OR = 1.32; 95% CI 1.14-1.52; p<0.001). Two years later, in the US, in a study of 5832 patients, Groves et al. found that patients admitted on the weekend had a statistically significant increase in mortality compared with those admitted on the weekdays (OR = 1.32; 95% CI 1.13-1.55; p=0.0004).

There are also two studies on lower limb ischaemia, both performed in the US. In a study of 63,768 patients with an ischaemic lower limb in 2014, Orandi et al. found no statistically significant association between weekend admission and in-hospital mortality (OR = 1.15; 95% CI 1.06-1.25; p=0.10). Whereas, Arora et al., a year later, in a similar study, did show a weekend effect. They found through multivariate analysis, that weekend admission (OR = 1.53; 95% CI 1.26-1.86; p<0.001) was a significant predictor of inhospital mortality.

In 2015, Tadisina et al. carried out the only study so far published on plastic surgery, investigating 50,346 US patients who had body contouring procedures. The authors found mortality rates to be higher on weekend admissions (3.7%) vs weekdays (0.5%). This is very surprising as presumably these are low risk operations.

=== Other specialist surgery ===
The first ENT study was carried out in the UK in 2016 by Patel et al. The authors found that 2208 elective tonsillectomies were performed on a weekday and 141 on the weekend. Post-tonsillectomy haemorrhages occurred in 104 patients (4.7%) who underwent the procedure on a weekday and in 10 patients (7.1%) who had surgery at the weekend (p = 0.20), i.e. not significantly different.

Also in 2016, Sayari et al., in the US, carried out a small study of (861) patients with esophageal atresia and tracheoesophageal fistula (EA/TEF). The cohort survival was 96%. Complication rates were higher with EA/TEF repair on a weekend (OR: 2.2) compared to a weekday. However weekend vs weekday procedure had no significant effect on mortality.

Blackwell et al., in the US, also in 2016, studied 10,301 patients who were admitted urgently for nephrolithiasis with obstruction to the renal tract. Weekend day admission significantly influenced time to intervention, and decreased the likelihood of intervention by 26% (p<0.001).

In summary, across a range of surgical conditions, little pattern was obvious with some conditions showing a weekend effect (e.g. small bowel obstruction and AAA) but others not (appendicitis and diverticulitis). In fractured neck of femur, two studies showed a weekend effect, two did not.

== Published research: Summary ==
In summary, in a majority (over 60%) of the over 190 studies described above, mortality is increased if the patient is admitted at the weekend. Of these, there are 56 very large studies (of over 100,000 patients). These have included 27.5 million (27514157) patients. Of these 56 studies, 29 concern patients in the US, and 11 in the UK or England. 25 are non-disease specific, 31 disease specific. 49/56 (88%) show the weekend effect, 6 no effect, one (Boylan et al, on fracture neck of femur) shows a weekday effect. All of the UK-based >100,000 patient studies show the weekend effect.

22/56 of these >100,000 patient studies, were carried out on over 1 million patients. Of these, 20/22 (91%) show the weekend effect, and 2 no effect (both neonatal mortality). The median relative risk (RR) of these papers is 1.11 (range 0.94-3.18), i.e. patients admitted at weekends are, on average, 11% more likely to die than those admitted in the week. This data takes into account confounding variables, as all these papers use regression analysis.

The following table summarises the larger studies (>100,000 patients) on the Weekend Effect and mortality:

Summary: Weekend Effect and Mortality (Studies of >100,000 Patients)

Author	Year	Country	Number Patients	Disease	Relative Risk	Weekend Effect
Ricciardi	2014	USA	48253968	Medicine	1.15	Yes
Vest-Hansen	2015	Denmark	174192	Medicine	Not stated	Yes
Ricciardi	2011	USA	29991621	Surgery (non-elective, NE)	1.1	Yes
Ricciardi	2016	USA	28236621	Surgery (non-elective)	1.08	Yes
Ozdemir	2016	UK	294602	Surgery (non-elective)	1.11	Yes
McClean	2016	UK	105002	Surgery (non-elective)	Not stated	Yes
Aylin	2013	UK	4133346	Surgery (elective, E)	1.82	Yes
McIsaac	2014	Canada	333344	Surgery (elective)	1.51	Yes
Mohammed	2012	UK	4640516	Surg (NE + E)	1.09 (NE) / 1.32 (E)	Yes
Glance	2016	USA	305853	Surg (NE + E)	2.11 (NE) / 3.18 (E)	Yes
Bell	2011	Canada	3789917	ED	Not stated	Yes
Cram	2004	Canada	641860	ED	1.03	Yes
Aylin	2010	UK	4317866	ED	1.1	Yes
Handel	2012	UK	5271327	ED	1.27	Yes
Powell	2013	USA	114611	ED (sepsis)	Not stated	No
Shin	2016	Taiwan	398043	Sepsis	1.11	Yes
Sharp	2013	Australia	4225973	ED	1.07	Yes
Concha	2014	Australia	3381962	ED	Not stated	Yes
Anselmi	2016	UK	3027946	ED	Not stated	Yes
Barnett	2002	USA	156136	ICU	1.09	Yes
Bhonagiri	2011	Australia	245057	ICU	1.06	Yes
Schilling	2010	USA	166920	Other	Not stated	Yes
Freemantle	2012	UK	14217640	Other	1.11 (Sat) / 1.16 (Sun)	Yes
Lee	2012	Malaysia, Eng, Australia, USA	126627	Other	1.22	Yes
Ruiz	2015	Netherlands	2982570	Other	Not stated	Yes
Koike	2011	Japan	173137	Cardiac Arrest (out-of-hospital)	1.0	No
Kostis	2007	USA	231164	AMI	1.05	Yes
Isogai	2015	Japan	111200	AMI	1.22	Yes
Khera	2013	USA	1434579	STEMI	Not stated	Yes
Khoshchehreh	2016	USA	13988772	STEMI (S) / NSTEMI (NS)	1.05 (S) / 1.3 (NS)	Yes
Agrawal	2016	USA	3625271	NSTEMI	1.02	Yes
Singh	2015	USA	401571	PCI	Not stated	Yes
Barba	2012	Spain	289077	COPD	1.07	Yes
Suissa	2014	Canada	323895	COPD / pneumonia	1.06	Yes
Nanchal	2012	USA	1143707	PE	1.17	Yes
Chang	2012	Taiwan	788011	Pneumonia	1.03	Yes
Shaheen	2009	USA	237412	Upper GI Bleed	1.06	Yes
Ananthakrishnan	2009	USA	419939	Upper GI Bleed	1.21	Yes
Abougergi	2014	USA	202340	Upper GI Bleed	1.11	No
Weeda	2016	USA	119353	Upper GI Bleed	1.09	Yes
Patel	2016	USA	4376950	Upper GI Bleed (post PCI)	Not stated	Yes
James	2010	USA	963730	Acute Kidney Injury	1.07	Yes
Sakhuja	2013	USA	3278572	Haemodialysis	1.18	Yes
Schmid	2014	USA	534011	Ca prostate	1.12	Yes
Lapointe-Shaw	2016	Canada	290471	Oncology	1.13	Yes
Hoh	2010	USA	599087	Stroke	Not stated	No
Smith	2010	Canada	274988	Stroke	Not stated	Yes
McKinney	2011	USA	134441	Stroke	1.05	Yes
Rumalia	2017	USA	404212	tSDH	Not stated	Yes
Newcastle	1977	UK	297000	Paediatric mortality	Not stated	Yes
Hamilton	2003	USA	111749	Neonatal mortality	Not stated	Yes
Gould	2003	USA	1615041	Neonatal mortality	1.12	No
Luo	2004	Canada	3239972	Neonatal mortality	1.11	No
Palmer	2015	UK	1349599	Perinatal mortality	1.07	Yes
Goldstein	2014	USA	439457	Paediatric surgery	1.63	Yes
Boylan	2015	USA	344989	Fracture neck of femur	0.94	Weekday effect
			27514157		Median 1.11	

== Published research: Discussion ==
This weekend effect is seen in non-selected (non disease-specific) studies, medical and surgical; for both non-elective and elective admissions, in most countries in the developed world. In fact, the strength of the effect is highest in elective surgical care; the highest relative risk being 3.18 in Glance et al in 2016, and 1.82 in Aylin et al, in 2013. However, it is not entirely valid to compare weekend vs weekday mortality in elective and non-elective surgical patients; as they may not be from the same patient groups - e.g. the elective patients may be older, with comorbidities, with degenerative or malignant disease (e.g. hip replacement or bowel carcinoma), and the non-elective younger with infection or inflammation (e.g. appendicitis).

In terms of the disease-specific studies, the larger studies showed good evidence for a weekend effect in myocardial infarction, cardiac arrest, AF, pulmonary embolus, COPD, pneumonia, upper GI bleed, stroke (probably), AAA; and in specialties including plastic surgery, and paediatrics and obstetrics (probably), including SIDS. There is variable evidence of an effect in ICU and psychiatry; and no evidence of an effect in disease group-specific studies in general, orthopaedic, vascular and other specialist surgery.

Public holidays, and 'Out-of-Hours' (weekday) admission and discharge, have also been studied. Public holidays may have a greater effect than the weekend. Sharp et al., in their 2013 paper, studied over 4.2 million adult ED admissions; and found the adjusted public holiday mortality was 48% higher at 7 days and 27% higher at 30 days. Laupland et al. in 2008 in Canada, studied 20,466 ICU admissions. Both night admission and discharge were independently associated with mortality. Similar findings regarding weekday out-of-hours care have been found by Freemantle et al. in 2012; and in cardiac arrest, by Pederby et al. in 2008 in the US, and by Robinson et al. in 2015 in the UK.

It has been suggested that most (but not all) of the contradictory studies are smaller, single hospital and statistically underpowered (Aylin, 2016); two very large neonatology studies (Gould et al., 2003; Luo et al, 2004) are the exceptions. There is no evidence of a weekend effect in terms of neonatal mortality. That excluded, in other words, a large study multicentre study may be necessary to show an effect; probably over 100,000 patients, as suggested above.

The consistency of the effect (most show an increase in mortality of 10-15%) is further evidence of biomedical meaning, as the studies have been carried all over the developed world. Furthermore, there is a tendency for the effect to be larger in the larger studies. That the trend is almost always suggestive of a raised mortality at weekends (even in studies where the effect did not reach statistical significance) further supports the hypothesis. In other words, the effect is almost always the 'right way around'. Though it cannot be ruled out that positive publication bias could be a factor in this observation. There are two studies—both orthopaedic—that show that weekday mortality is more than the weekend (Carr et al., 2011; Boylan et al, 2015).

There are many reasons to think this effect is real. Firstly, the effect is seen in such a wide range of patients, medical and surgical, unselected and selected. Secondly, the effect is very consistent in terms of the degree of difference (10–15%). Thirdly, the effect is seen in many developed countries on several continents, all of which have a 'Saturday/Sunday weekend concept'.

Furthermore, to make this point, Ruiz et al., in 2015 stated in the discussion in their International comparative study: "Due to limitations of administrative datasets, we cannot determine the reasons for these findings; however, the international nature of our database suggests that this is a systematic phenomenon affecting healthcare providers across borders."

Fourthly, in conditions where by their acute nature (e.g. AMI, pulmonary embolus and child birth), they are likely to be admitted on the day and be no more common on weekdays or weekends, the effect is still seen. Such conditions are normally looked after by teams that work normal patterns at weekends. This may also imply that the effect is strong, a 'whole system' issue, and be difficult to overcome. This is a concern. It is not clear why stroke has a variable effect. Fifthly, and finally—and perhaps the strongest argument—it is unlikely that elective care patients would have been chosen for surgery at the weekend if they were high risk.

There are several alternative explanations for this effect, including the hypothesis that an increase in mortality is due to a different (frailer) demography of patients being admitted at the end of the week (e.g. Friday and Saturday). There are two counter-arguments to this idea. Firstly, if this was the case, it is unlikely that the effect would be seen in elective admissions. Secondly, in most of the papers described above, weekend vs weekday data has been studied by multivariate analysis (i.e. taking comorbidities into account).

== Cause of weekend effect ==
The cause of this effect is unclear. It could be a 'purely medical problem', i.e. the mortality is increased due to reduced medical staffing levels at the weekend. The cardiology, nephrology, paediatric and obstetric studies are against this argument; as these are all specialties where senior medical staff usually work normally at weekends. It could be due to a combination of medical, nursing and other health professional staff being less available at weekends. There is some evidence for the importance of nursing numbers, in terms of weekend mortality. In Neuraz et al's study in 2015, the patient-to-nurse ratio was more important that the ratio of patient-to-physician. Alternatively, the effect may not just be a health issue, i.e. it could be due to reduced health and social care availability (that the patient may be discharged into) at the weekend.

As described above in the Discussion, there is also considerable literature on the 'Out-of-Hours Effect'. This effect is seen during the week and at weekends. The study by Lee et al in 2012, looked at (and compared) the 'Out-of-Hours' and 'Weekend Effect' on the same dataset (of 126,627 patients). In this, and other such studies, the degree of effect is usually higher for the 'Out-of-Hours Effect' rather than the 'Weekend Effect'. This suggests that the 'Weekend Effect' may be nothing to do with the weekend per se, but may be an effect caused by varying staffing levels, and less intensive working practices, outside the '9-5 Monday-Friday window'. In the Lee paper, the relative risk of 'Out-of-Hours Effect' was 1.67, compared to 1.22 for the 'Weekend Effect'.

Another alternative is that it may not be a health (or social, or both) issue at all. It could be a manifestation of a societal problem—i.e., due to a combination of health-social care and other (as yet unidentified) aspects of society (financial, working patterns of relatives etc.)—or nothing to do with health-social care. Indeed, a 'weekend effect' has been observed in other (non-health) aspects of society. For example, in the financial world, a 'weekend effect' is well documented. It is the phenomenon in financial markets, in which stock returns on Mondays are often significantly lower than those of the immediately preceding Friday. One theory attributes it to the tendency for companies to release bad news on a Friday after the markets close; which depresses stock prices on the following Monday. This is analogous to the theory put forward by some health professionals that challenge the (health) weekend effect by saying it is due to the tendency of GPs and nursing homes etc. to admit their iller patients on a Friday—so they do not have a problem over the weekend.

The Japanese paper by Koike et al in 2011, is important in this debate. It is a large study (of 173,137 patients) who had had an 'out-of-hospital' cardiac arrest. And importantly, its negative, with a relative risk of 1.0 - i.e. no weekend effect was seen. If the weekend effect was a societal problem (it could be), this might be positive. This gives some weight to the argument that it relates to health (plus or minus social) care and is amenable to change if we can change the cause(s), e.g. working patterns.

Of course, the (health) weekend 'effect' is really an association. A variety of possible causes have been discussed above. A combination of such factors is likely. And the solution will vary according to the cause(s). A huge controlled trial would be necessary to prove causation and reversilibility. This is unlikely to happen; so a more pragmatic approach will be required. If the cause cannot be identified, it can only be assumed that all these factors will have to be addressed, if we want to decrease the weekend effect. In Nov 2014, the East Midlands Senate published an extensive report that described the services provided by a group of hospitals in the UK during the week and at weekends. This is a good summary of the size of the task that may be ahead for the NHS.

== Weekend effect and working patterns ==
A small number of studies have examined the evidence for an association between the weekend effect and patterns of health professional working; six studies have addressed medical staffing, two have addressed nursing issues, and two have addressed both.

In 2011, in a study of COPD patients in the UK, Brims et al. found that after opening a Medical Admission Unit, the risk of death on day 1 after weekend winter admission fell from 3.63 (95% CI 1.15-11.5) to 1.65 (95% CI 0.14-19.01). Similarly, Bell et al., in 2013, in the UK, found an 'all inclusive' pattern of consultant working, incorporating a minimum consultant presence of 4 hours per day, was associated with reduced excess weekend mortality. In the US, in 2014, Ricciardi et al., in another medical study, found that mortality following a weekend admission for patients admitted to a hospital with resident trainees, was significantly higher than hospitals with no resident trainees.

The effects of the introduction of a 7-day consultant service have been investigated in medical patients. In 2015, Leong et al., in an uncontrolled study of elderly medical patients in the UK, stated "introduction of seven-day consultant working was associated with a reduction in in-hospital mortality from 11.4% to 8.8%". They also found that weekend discharges increased from general medical wards but did not increase from elderly medicine wards.

Blecker et al., also in 2015, in the US, studied 57,163 ED admissions, before and after implementation of an intervention to improve patient care at weekends. The average length of stay decreased by 13%, and the number of weekend discharges increased by 12%. But the intervention had no impact on readmissions or mortality.

Aldridge et al., in the UK in 2016, found that there was no significant association between Sunday-to-Wednesday specialist intensity ratios and weekend-to-weekday mortality ratios.

Two stroke studies have looked at working patterns. In 2013 in France, Bejot el al. found that onset during weekends/public holidays was associated with a higher risk of 30-day mortality during 1985-2003 but not during 2004–2010; before and after the introduction of a dedicated stroke care network. In 2014, Bray et al., in the UK, found that the highest risk of death observed was in stroke services with the lowest nurse/bed ratios.

Similarly, Ambrosi et al., in 2016, found that elderly medical patients in Italy who were receiving less care by Registered Nurses (RNs) at weekends, were at increased risk of dying; while those receiving a higher skill-mix, thus indicating that more nursing care was offered by RNs instead of Nursing Auxiliaries, were at less risk of dying.

Neuraz et al., in a French adult ICU study in 2015, found the risk of death increased when the patient-to-nurse ratio was greater than 2.5, and when the patient-to-physician ratio exceeded 14. The highest ratios occurred more frequently during the weekend for nurse staffing, and during the night for physicians. Similarly, Ozdemir et al., in a UK ED study in 2016, found that the lowest mortality rates were observed in hospitals with higher levels of medical and nursing staffing; and a greater number of operating theatres and critical care beds relative to hospital size.

It has long been argued that the weekend effect may be due to a lower quality of clinical services at the weekend. Australian researchers Richardson et al., in 2014 were the first to observe and quantify junior doctor work practices at the weekend. The authors report that doctors were frequently interrupted, engaged in high levels of multitasking, and had very few breaks when compared to work practices during the week.

In summary, there is variable evidence that working patterns are a factor in the weekend effect; with nurse:patient ratio possibly being more important than physicians' pattern of working. It is unclear whether changing the patterns will reverse the effect.

== Politics ==
In July 2015, UK Health Secretary, Jeremy Hunt, quoted a mortality increase of 15% around weekends. This is in keeping with the literature outlined above. This figure had been used the UK Department of Health to propose a "7-day NHS" involving increased staffing at weekend.

The weekend effect is an area of particular interest in the UK's National Health Service, and some have attributed it to fewer staff being available during the weekend period. The Royal College of Physicians in 2010 issued a position statement,

"Hospitals undertaking the admission of acutely ill medical patients should have a consultant physician on‐site for at least 12 hours per day, seven days per week, at times related to peak admission periods. The consultant should have no other duties scheduled during this period.

While much of the work of the consultant physician will be on the acute medical unit, provision should be made for a daily consultant visit to all medical wards. In many hospitals this will require input from more than one physician."

Currently emergency treatment, or acute care, is available at all major NHS hospitals at weekends. In most hospitals, sick patients receive care from consultants in 'acute' specialties, such as Accident and Emergency, General and Orthopaedic Surgery, Medicine, Anaesthetics, Intensive care, Paediatrics, Obstetrics, Pathology and Radiology. However, most patients are seen at time of diagnosis of an illness and treated, but are not routinely reviewed by any doctor at weekends. In November 2013, the Academy of Royal Medical Colleges set out to address this matter in a document entitled Seven Day Consultant Present Care - Implementation Considerations. Research identified that patients in hospitals fell into ten key specialties, and discussed the benefit and costs of daily consultant review.

Elective services, or routine care, is rarely carried out at weekends. The provision of seven day elective services has proved divisive between doctors. In 2013, the NHS England (NHSE) Medical Director Prof Sir Bruce Keogh wrote that there is a clinical and compassionate argument for patient convenience. Other doctors state that overall patients are unlikely to benefit, and that limited NHS budget and resources would be better invested in providing better emergency care to improve mortality.

In 2015, Health Secretary Jeremy Hunt quoted that the 'weekend effect' in the NHS equated to 11,000 excess deaths a year. Some are now reporting the Hunt Effect - that some patients, too scared to attend hospital at weekends because of the weekend effect, have become seriously ill or even died as a direct consequence of waiting until Monday before seeking medical advice. The authors state,

"To assume that [the 11,000 deaths] are avoidable would be rash and misleading."

The paper was criticised by some clinicians unhappy with the findings, and a comment by a professor of cardiovascular epidemiology suggested that the report was data-driven rather than based on a hypothesis; in fact the 2015 paper was a development from previous work which analysed an earlier data set in 2012.

In response to the 'weekend effect' and the lack of seven day elective services, there have been proposals for major reform to contracts of NHS staff. Staff are in support of strengthening weekend services, but junior doctors have criticised these changes as they do not account for the 40% increase in workload. The UK's main doctors union, the British Medical Association, is still negotiating, as they would like assurances that new contracts will safeguard against long working hours, and are fair for female employees and those with families. Junior doctors (any doctor in consultant training) have protested across the country that the changes to their contracts are not safe and may harm patients.

In July 2015, some UK consultants challenged suggestions that the weekend effect is due (in part) to consultants who opt out of weekends a figure later shown after FOI request to be less than 0.5%. However, in a BBC FOI request (in March 2014), it was found that "Hospitals in England had an average of 86 consultants on a Wednesday, compared to just over eight in the afternoon at the weekend."

Research published in 2017 analysing outcomes in 79 NHS Trusts in England which had instituted 7-day changes based on the "NHS Services, Seven Days a Week" policy, showed that these changes did not result in improvements in mortality rates, admission rates, length of hospital stay nor A&E four-hour breaches overall.
