= Johann Malawana =

British entrepreneur and former physician

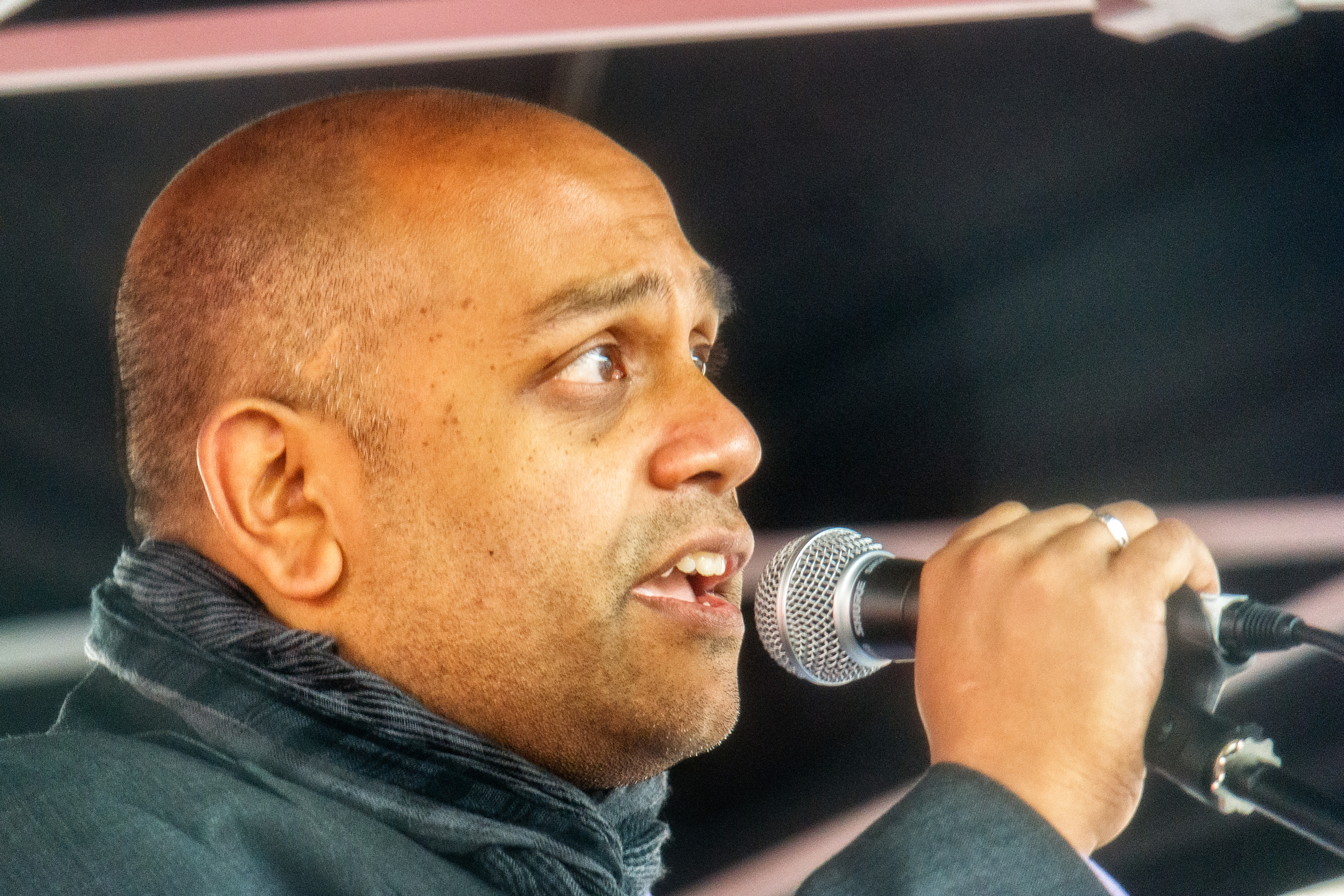
- Malawana in 2016
- Born: November 1979 (age 46)
- Education: Barts and The London School of Medicine and Dentistry
- Known for: Chair of the Junior Doctors Committee of the British Medical Association (September 2015 – July 2016)
- Medical career
- Field: Obstetrics

Johann Niranjan Lyle Malawana (born November 1979) is a British entrepreneur and former obstetrics doctor. Malawana was the Chair of the British Medical Association's Junior Doctors Committee from September 2015 to July 2016. His tenure included the 2015 junior doctors contract dispute in England where he was the lead negotiator on the new contract. Malawana founded technology company Medics.Academy and The Healthcare Leadership Academy in 2016.

== Early life and education ==
Malawana was born in November 1979 and grew up in Gants Hill, London. He studied at Barts and The London School of Medicine and Dentistry, graduating with a medical degree in 2005. While there he was president of its students union between 2002 and 2003 and later the Medical Students Officer of the University of London Union between 2003 and 2005. Malawana was the deputy chair for education on the British Medical Association (BMA) medical students committee between 2004 and 2005.

== Career ==
After completing the Foundation Programme, Malawana chose to specialise in obstetrics and became a specialty registrar in 2008 at the Barts and The London NHS Trust, before becoming an academic registrar at Imperial College London between 2010 and 2014. The following year he worked at University College London Hospitals NHS Foundation Trust and the Royal Free London NHS Foundation Trust.

On 26 September 2015, Malawana was elected as the chair of the BMA's Junior Doctors Committee. In the same month, the then Secretary of State for Health Jeremy Hunt announced a new junior doctor contract which reclassified "normal" hours for which they would not be paid a premium as between 7am and 10pm from Monday to Friday and 7am and 7pm on Saturdays and an increase in basic pay. He later announced that it would be imposed from August 2016 after the BMA withdrew from negotiations. This led to the 2015 junior doctors contract dispute in England. In response, the BMA announced a ballot for industrial action. The ballot result was announced in November and included over 37,000 junior doctors, of which 98% voted for strike action on a turnout of 76%. In the same month, Malawana was named by the Health Service Journal to be the 78th most influential person in the English NHS. Junior doctors in England undertook a series of strikes in January, February, and April 2016. It was the first industrial action taken by doctors in the UK since 1975. The April strike was also the first to include withdrawal from emergency cover.

Malawana was the BMA's lead negotiator and agreed the terms of a new contract in May 2016 which he recommended to union members to accept. In July 2016, the BMA balloted junior doctor and final year medical student members on the final offer from the government on the new contract. They voted to reject the new contract by 58% to 42% on a turnout of 68%. Malawana resigned on the same day of the result. Hunt imposed the new contract on junior doctors in England from October 2016.

Malawana left the obstetrics training programme in 2015 and founded technology company Medics.Academy, the following year after his resignation as chair of the BMA's Junior Doctors Committee, to improve training of the healthcare workforce, and later The Healthcare Leadership Academy to help students and young professionals in the field to develop their leadership skills. Between 2018 and 2020, he was the lead for education and training at Healthcare UK, a cross government initiative. Malawana became a senior fellow at the University of Central Lancashire in 2021.

== Personal life ==
Malawana is married to a GP. He previously ran a photography business between 2012 and 2014.
