= Mark Porter (anaesthetist) =

British anaesthetist

Mark Porter FRCA (born 18 April 1962) is a British consultant anaesthetist who served as chair of the British Medical Association from 2012 to June 2017 when he was succeeded by Chaand Nagpaul.

== Early life and education ==
Porter was born in Newcastle-under-Lyme on 18 April 1962 to Jean and John Porter. He studied at the University of Leicester graduating with a BSc in medical science in 1983, and MB ChB in 1989.

== Career ==
Porter has been a consultant anaesthetist at University Hospital Coventry since 1998, specialising in obstetric and paediatric anaesthesia.

He was said by the Health Service Journal to be the 24th most powerful person in the English NHS in December 2013.

In December 2013 he warned the British Medical Association, 'The financial outlook is dire. The NHS is struggling just to keep pace. A growing and ageing population, public health problems like obesity, and constant advances in treatment and technology are all contributing to push NHS costs well above general inflation. The numbers overall are so bad that if the NHS was a country, it would barely have a credit rating at all.'
