= List of public art in Strand, London =

This is a list of public art in and around Strand, a thoroughfare in the City of Westminster, London.

Strand has linked Westminster with the City of London since the time of the Anglo-Saxons. Aldwych is a crescent at its eastern end created during urban improvements in the early 20th century. Among the examples of architectural sculpture in this area, Jacob Epstein's reliefs of the Ages of Man for Zimbabwe House (originally the British Medical Association building) are of particular note. These were the sculptor's first major works in Britain and the subject of heated controversy due to the figures' nudity in a public setting.

On the campus of the London School of Economics, much of the public art was bequeathed to the university in 2005 by Louis Odette, a Canadian alumnus who also founded the Windsor Sculpture Park in Windsor, Ontario. He bequeathed a total of 13 works, mainly by Canadian sculptors, to the institution. Not all of those works are within the remit of this list, as some are situated indoors or in the adjacent borough of Camden.

Image	Title / subject	Location and coordinates	Date	Artist / designer	Architect / other	Type	Designation	Notes
	Bust of Robert Devereux, 3rd Earl of Essex	Devereux Court	c. 1676	Attributed to Caius Gabriel Cibber		Bust	Grade II	
More images	Statue of George III	Somerset House, Edmond J. Safra Fountain Court 51.5113°N 0.1174°W	c. 1790	John Bacon	William Chambers	Sculptural groups	Grade I	The King, in the upper group, leans on a rudder and is flanked by a British lion and the prow of a classical barge; the Thames is represented below him as a river god. The maritime theme refers both to the function of the building, as offices for the Royal Navy (among other institutions), and to the King himself as steering the ship of state.
	Lions sejant	The Law Society, Chancery Lane	1852 (original model)	Alfred Stevens	Charles Holden	Iron railing finials	Grade II*	Copies of the figures originally designed for the (now removed) dwarf-posts outside the British Museum, incorporated by Holden into his Law Society extension of 1902–1904. The same design also appears on the railings surrounding Stevens's magnum opus, the Duke of Wellington's tomb in St Paul's Cathedral (completed in 1912).
	Kaled (also known as Lara's Page or Kaled on the Morning of Lara's Battle)	193 Fleet Street	1872–1873	Giuseppe Grandi	Archer & Green	Statue in niche	Grade II	
More images	Architectural sculpture	193 Fleet Street	1883	Houghton of Great Portland Street	Archer & Green	Architectural sculpture	Grade II	
	Truth, Justice, Liberty and Mercy	The Law Society	1902–1904	Charles James Pibworth	Charles Holden	Architectural sculpture	Grade II*	
More images	Statue of Peter II, Count of Savoy	Savoy Hotel, Strand	1904 (erected)	Frank Lynn Jenkins	Thomas Edward Collcutt	Statue	Grade II	
More images	Memorial to William Ewart Gladstone	Strand, in front of St Clement Danes 51.5130°N 0.1146°W	1905	William Hamo Thornycroft	John Lee	Memorial with statue and other sculpture	Grade II	Unveiled 4 November 1905. Allegorical figures around the base represent Courage, Education, Aspiration and Brotherhood. Also represented are the arms of Gladstone's constituencies, Midlothian, Oxford University, the Duchy of Lancaster and Newark.
	Architectural sculpture on Milford Lane	Milford Lane, near the junction with Strand 51.5128°N 0.1137°W	c. 1900–1925	Henry Poole	—N/a	Repurposed architectural sculpture	—N/a	Commissioned for the offices of the United Kingdom Provident Institution, demolished in the 1970s.
	Architectural sculpture on Milford Lane	Milford Lane, opposite Little Essex Street 51.5124°N 0.1134°W	c. 1900–1925	Henry Poole	—N/a	Repurposed architectural sculpture	—N/a	Commissioned for the offices of the United Kingdom Provident Institution, demolished in the 1970s.
	Architectural sculpture on Milford Lane	Milford Lane, at junction with Tweezer's Alley 51.5121°N 0.1131°W	c. 1900–1925	Henry Poole	—N/a	Repurposed architectural sculpture	—N/a	Commissioned for the offices of the United Kingdom Provident Institution, demolished in the 1970s.
More images	The Ages of Man	429 Strand (Zimbabwe House)	1907–1908	Jacob Epstein	Charles Holden	Reliefs	Grade II*	
More images	Statue of Samuel Johnson	Strand, behind St Clement Danes 51.5132°N 0.1136°W	1910	Percy Hetherington Fitzgerald	—N/a	Statue	Grade II	Unveiled 4 August 1910. Fitzgerald was an amateur sculptor and something of a self-appointed authority on Dr Johnson, who was a parishioner of St Clement's. A portrait medallion of James Boswell is set into the pedestal, which is a post-war replacement for the original.
More images	The Prosperity of Australia	Left of the main entrance of Australia House, Aldwych/Strand	1915–1918	Harold Parker	Alexander Marshall Mackenzie	Architectural sculpture	Grade II	
More images	The Awakening of Australia	Right of the main entrance of Australia House, Aldwych/Strand	1915–1918	Harold Parker	Alexander Marshall Mackenzie	Architectural sculpture	Grade II	
More images	Phoebus Driving the Horses of the Sun	Australia House, Aldwych/Strand	1919; erected 1923	Bertram Mackennal	Alexander Marshall Mackenzie	Architectural sculpture	Grade II	
More images	Civil Service Rifles War Memorial	Somerset House, River Terrace 51.51032°N 0.11756°W	1923	—N/a	Edwin Lutyens	Memorial	Grade II*	Unveiled 27 January 1924 in the centre of the courtyard of Somerset House; relocated in 2002. The fictive flags are a feature that Lutyens originally intended to employ on the Cenotaph in Whitehall. Originally these were of copper but they have been replaced by flags carved from stone and painted.
	Memorial to Andrew Young	Strand, rear of central block of Bush House 51.5125°N 0.1169°W	1924	Eric Bradbury	Harvey Wiley Corbett (Bush House)	Plaque with portrait relief	—N/a	Inscribed IN MEMORY OF/ ANDREW YOUNG F.S.I/ FIRST VALUER TO THE LONDON COUNTY COUNCIL/ 1884–1914/ HE LABOURED TO BEAUTIFY/ THE LONDON HE LOVED. Young oversaw the building of Aldwych and Kingsway in 1899–1905.
	Anglo-American Friendship	Bush House, Aldwych 51.5131°N 0.1175°W	1924–1925	Malvina Hoffman	Harvey Wiley Corbett (Bush House)	Architectural sculpture	Grade II	
	Two elephants and a relief of the Lion Capital of Ashoka	India House, Aldwych	1930s			Architectural sculpture	Grade II	
	Twelve decorations representing the states of India	India House, Aldwych	1930s			Architectural sculpture	Grade II	
	Thought	Old Building (London School of Economics), Clare Market	1932–1933	Edgar Silver Frith	A. S. G. Butler	Bas-reliefs	—N/a	
	Mosaic	St Clement's Building (London School of Economics), corner of Clare Market and Portugal Street 51.5144°N 0.1170°W	1961	Harry Warren Wilson	White-Cooper & Turner	Mosaic	—N/a	The mosaic represents the River Thames and subjects taught at the LSE.
	Winged Form	Gray's Inn Fields	1968	Geoffrey Wickham		Architectural sculpture		
More images	Statue of Hugh Dowding, 1st Baron Dowding	Strand, in front of St Clement Danes 51.5130°N 0.1143°W	1988	Faith Winter	C. A. Hart	Statue	—N/a	Unveiled 30 October 1988 by the Queen Mother. The first of a pair of statues of notable Royal Air Force personnel to be erected outside St Clement Danes, the Central Church of the RAF. The pose has been described as "deliberately unheroic".
	The Marchers	King's College, London	1975	Fred Kormis		Relief		
More images	Bust of Jawaharlal Nehru	India Place 51.5123°N 0.1185°W	1991	Latika Katt	Peter Leach Associates	Bust	—N/a	Unveiled 14 November 1991 in India House.
More images	Statue of Sir Arthur Harris, 1st Baronet	Strand, in front of St Clement Danes 51.5131°N 0.1144°W	1992	Faith Winter	T. Hart and Michael Goss	Statue	—N/a	Unveiled 31 May 1992 by the Queen Mother. The decision to commemorate "Bomber" Harris ignited a major controversy and was criticised by the mayors of Cologne and Dresden. The unveiling was met by a public protest.
	Reliefs	111 Strand	2001–2002	Langlands & Bell	Squire & Partners	Architectural sculpture	—N/a	A simplified version of the surrounding street plan, in panels of Portland stone.
More images	Baby Tembo	John Watkins Plaza (London School of Economics) 51.5143°N 0.1167°W	2002	Derrick Stephan Hudson	—N/a	Sculpture	—N/a	Part of the Odette bequest. This work and Yolanda vanderGaast's Penguin were formerly sited on Clare Market as the LSE crèche was at that time located at the top of the street, and it was thought that these sculptures might appeal to children.
	Three Fates	Clement's Inn, opposite Pethick-Lawrence House (London School of Economics) 51.5137°N 0.1149°W	2003	Morton Katz	—N/a	Sculpture	—N/a	Part of the Odette bequest.
	Equus	John Watkins Plaza, outside the British Library of Political and Economic Science 51.5145°N 0.1160°W	2003	Edwina Sandys	—N/a	Sculpture	—N/a	Part of the Odette bequest. A bronze copy of a smaller marble original of 1977, produced during the artist's "Stone Age" period.
	Bluerain	Lionel Robbins Building (London School of Economics), Portugal Street	2009	Michael Brown			—N/a	
More images	Penguin	John Watkins Plaza (London School of Economics) 51.5144°N 0.1168°W	2009	Yolanda vanderGaast	—N/a	Sculpture	—N/a	Part of the Odette bequest. VanderGaast's original Penguin of 2002 stood in Clare Market from 2005. In 2009 it was stolen; the thieves left only the flippers behind. A replacement statue was installed that year; in 2015 it moved to its current site.
	Final Sale	Old Building (London School of Economics), Houghton Street	2015	Recycle Group (Andrey Blokhin and Georgy Kuznetsov)	—N/a	Relief	—N/a	
More images	The World Turned Upside Down	Outside the Saw Swee Hock Student Centre (London School of Economics), Sheffield Street	2019	Mark Wallinger	—N/a	Sculpture	—N/a	Unveiled 26 March 2019.
	The Ark	Lincoln Square, Carey Street 51.5148°N 0.1139°W	2019	Pablo Reinoso	—N/a	Sculpture	—N/a	

== Bibliography ==
- Bradley, Simon; Pevsner, Nikolaus (2003). London 6: Westminster. The Buildings of England. London and New Haven: Yale University Press. ISBN 978-0-300-09595-1.
- Hibbert, Christopher; Weinreb, Ben; Keay, Julia; Keay, John (2008). The London Encyclopaedia. London: Macmillan. ISBN 978-1405049245.
- Seebohm, Caroline (2011). Edwina Sandys: Art. New York: Glitterati Incorporated. ISBN 978-0982379998.
- Ward-Jackson, Philip (2003). Public Sculpture of the City of London. Public Sculpture of Britain. Vol. 7. Liverpool: Liverpool University Press. ISBN 0-85323-977-0.
- ——— (2011). Public Sculpture of Historic Westminster: Volume 1. Public Sculpture of Britain. Vol. 14. Liverpool: Liverpool University Press. ISBN 978-1-84631-691-3.
