= History of the London School of Economics =

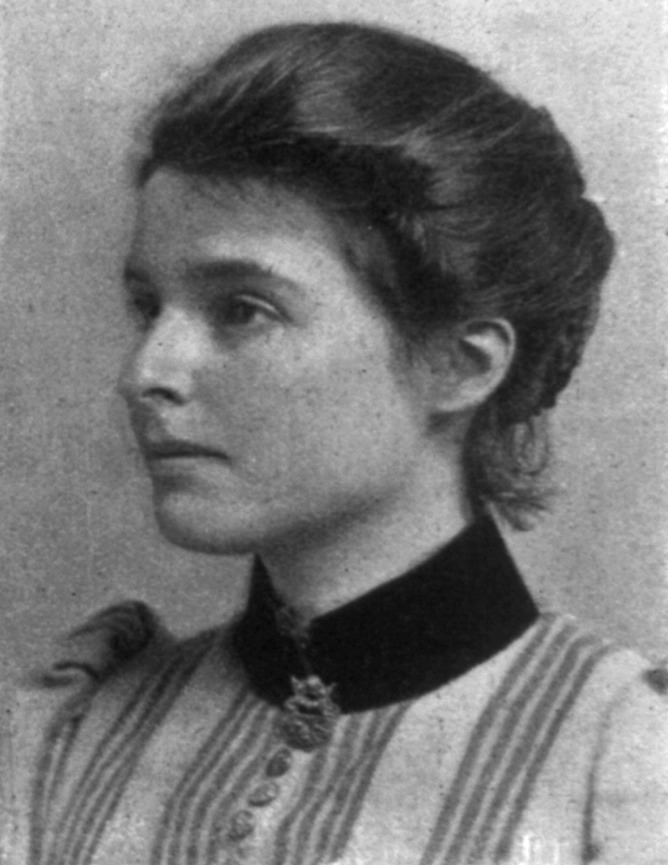
Beatrice Webb was a co-founder of the Fabian Society and of the LSE.

The history of the London School of Economics dates from 1895, when the School was founded by Fabian Society members Sidney and Beatrice Webb, Graham Wallas, and George Bernard Shaw, with funding provided by private philanthropy, including a bequest of £20,000 from Henry Hunt Hutchinson to the Fabian Society.

== Foundation and early history ==
Supposedly the decision to found the school was made at a breakfast party on 4 August 1894. All believed in advancing socialist causes by reformist rather than revolutionary means, and the LSE was established to further the Fabian aim of bettering society, focusing on research on issues of poverty, inequality and related issues. This led the Fabians, and the LSE, to be one of the main influences on the UK Labour Party.

The School was founded with the initial intention of renewing the training of Britain's political and business elite, which seemed to be faltering due to inadequate teaching and research - the number of postgraduate students was dwarfed by those in other countries. A year before the founding, the British Association for the Advancement of Science pushed for the need to advance the systematic study of social sciences as well. In fact, Sidney and Beatrice Webb used the curriculum of the Institut d'Etudes Politiques de Paris (best known as "Sciences Po"), which covered the full range of the social sciences, as part of their inspiration for moulding the LSE's educational purpose. LSE was opened in October 1895 at No. 9 John Street, Adelphi, originally as a night school to bring higher education to the working classes.

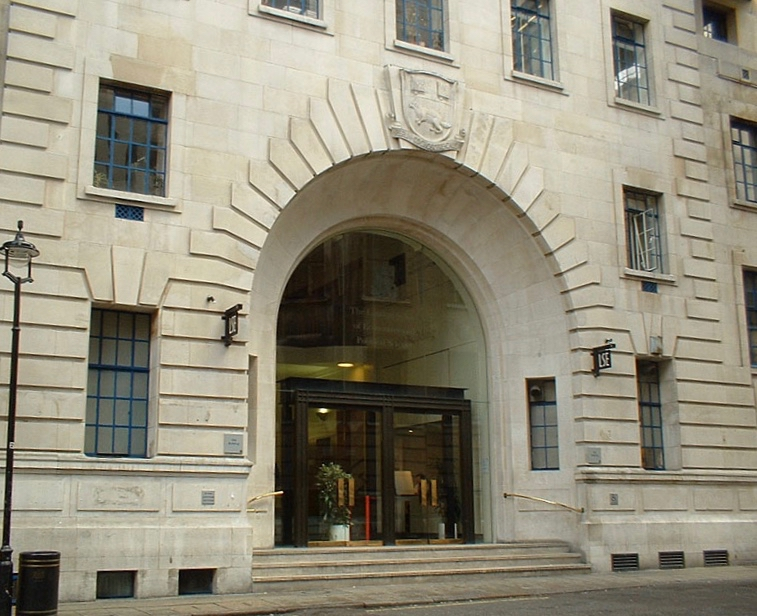
The LSE's arms appear above the main entrance to the Old Building, which opened in 1922.

The School expanded rapidly and was moved along with its newly established library, the British Library of Political and Economic Science to No. 10 Adelphi Terrace in September 1896, continuing to expand through the next couple of years thanks to Shaw. In 1902, The Coefficients dining club was regularly meeting in the Library, and they affected the development of LSE along with the Fabians and the Suffragettes movement (who also first met at LSE). In 1900, the School became officially recognised as a Faculty of Economics within the much larger University of London in Bloomsbury, and began enrolling students for bachelor's degrees and doctorates in the same year. At the same time, the LSE began expanding into other areas of social sciences, including, initially, geography (in 1902) and philosophy (in 1903), pioneering the study of international relations, as well as teaching history, law, psychology and sociology. By 1902, it was apparent the School had and would continue to outgrow its Adelphi Terrace location, and moved to its present campus in Clare Market off the Aldwych and aside Kingsway - not far from Whitehall, in 1902. The Old Building, which remains a significant office and classroom building, was opened on Houghton Street in 1922.

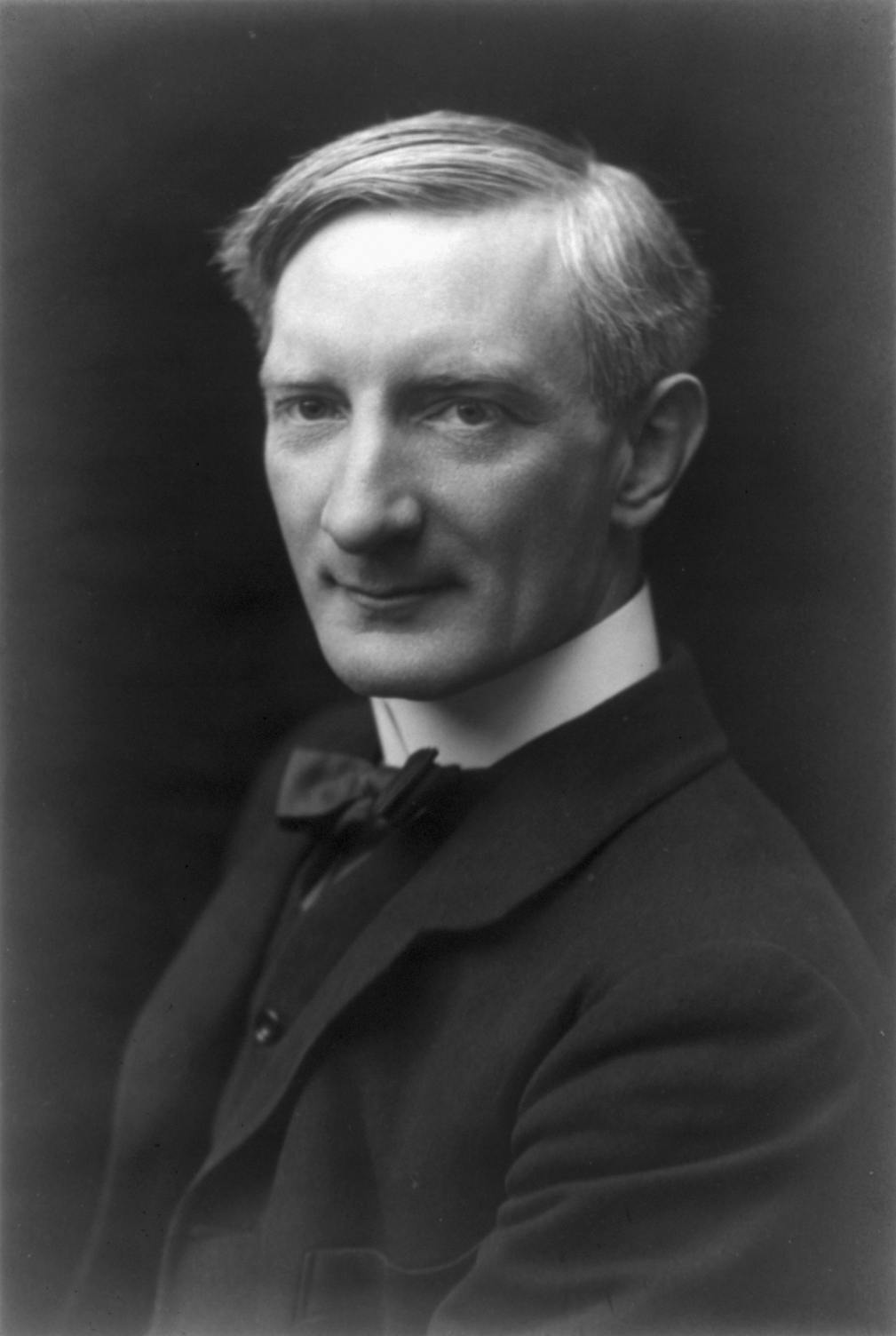
William Beveridge was LSE Director from 1919 until 1937.

During these years and under the directorship of William Beveridge, future father of the welfare state and the National Health Service, LSE redefined the study of economics and the new conception of the study of economics as "a science which studies human behaviour as a relationship between ends and scarce means which have alternative uses" is looked to as the norm. LSE in this sense must be looked at as the father of modern economics studies. Under Beveridge, Friedrich Hayek was appointed as a professor and he brought about the ascendancy of the LSE through his famous debates with John Maynard Keynes.

In 1939, with the outbreak of the Second World War, LSE's Houghton Street campus became home to the Ministry for Economic Warfare, whilst following discussions between school Director, Carr-Saunders and Winston Churchill, it was agreed to temporarily relocate the school to Cambridge, where it took over Peterhouse. Initially for a period of a year, the beginning of the Blitz led to LSE's post at Cambridge to be lengthened, returning to London in 1945.

The famed Keynes-Hayek debates which occurred between Cambridge and the LSE still shapes the two major schools of economic thought today as countries still debate the merits of the welfare state versus an economy solely controlled by the market. LSE's influence upon modern economics is undeniable since it both formed the very basis for economic thought as well as shaped modern perception of free market economics. Hayek's works continue to influence the study of economics across the globe. At the other extreme, during these years Harold Joseph Laski, a professor of political science at the LSE was influential in British politics as an advocate of far left policies. Many renowned world leaders including John F. Kennedy (and his brother Robert F. Kennedy) studied under his guidance at the LSE.

== Recent history ==
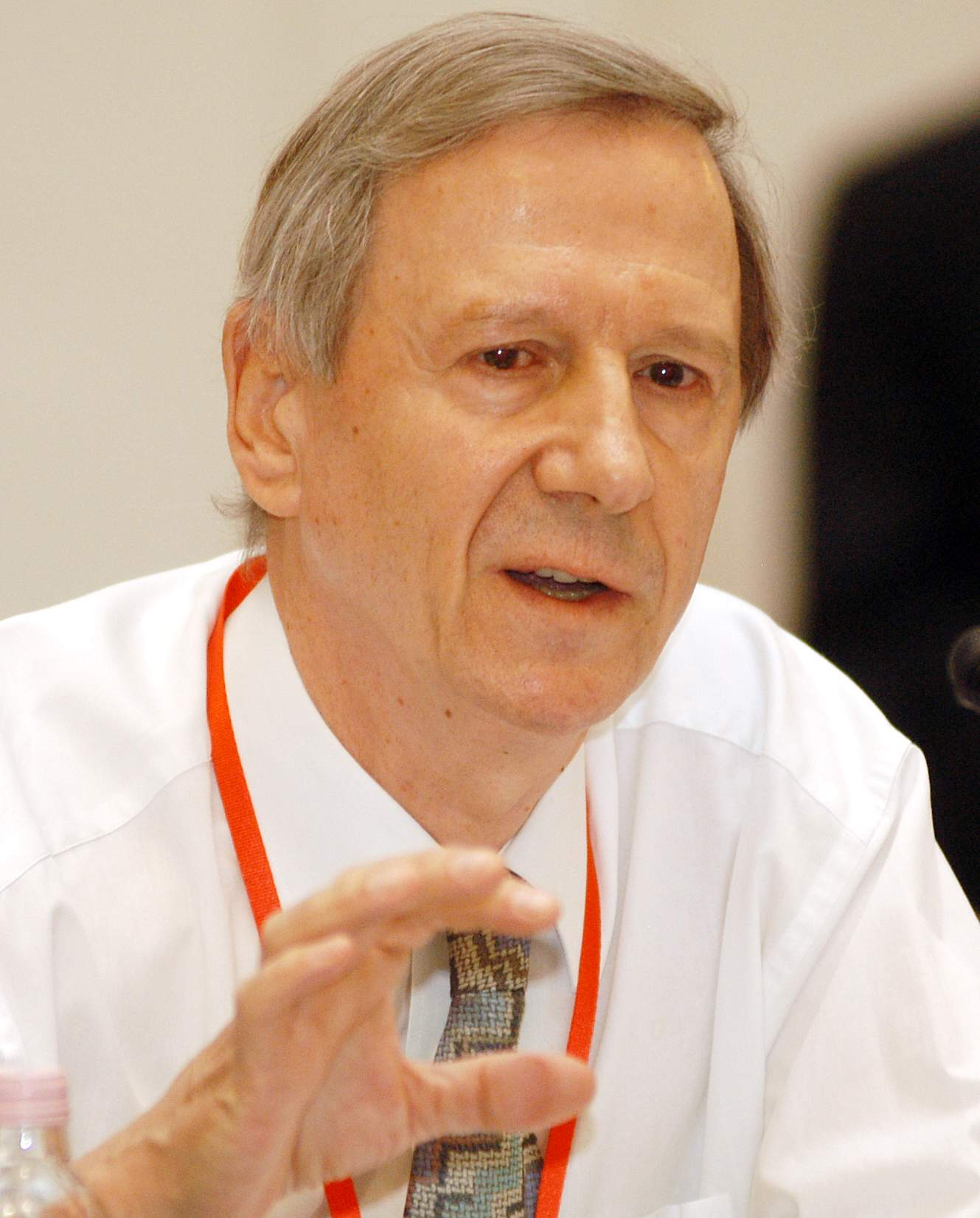
Sociologist Anthony Giddens is a recent former Director of the LSE, and a key proponent of third way politics.

While the LSE's initial reputation was that of a socialist-leaning institution, this had changed by the 1960s, with LSE Director Walter Adams fighting hard to remove LSE from its Fabian roots. This led to many student protests, which also involved Lionel Robbins, who had returned to LSE as chairman of governors, having been a member of staff for many years.

Anthony Giddens, the former Director of the LSE, stands as the creator of the "Third Way" followed by both Tony Blair (who unveiled the Fabian Window at LSE in 2005) and Bill Clinton. His policy created a balance between the traditional welfare state and the belief in total free market economics. This policy is being put into effect by governments all across the world as free market economies continue to deal with wealth inequalities and bettering the welfare of the general population.

In 2002, it was reported that the school had applied to the Privy Council for the power to award its own degrees. Degree-awarding powers being granted, the LSE continued to award University of London degrees until February 2007, when the LSE's Director, Sir Howard Davies, announced that the school had sought permission from the University to award degrees in its own name. All students who registered with the school since the beginning of the academic year 2007/08 are now awarded LSE degrees.

=== Libya links ===
On 4 March 2011, LSE's Director Howard Davies resigned over allegations that the LSE had accepted donations from the Libyan government in return for favourable treatment.
