= Frances Dawson =

Frances Dawson may refer to:

- Frances L. Dawson (1903–1995), American educator and politician
- Frances Boyd Dawson (1871–1926), British social activist
