= Fabian Window =

Stained glass window designed by George Bernard Shaw

Coordinates: 51.514°N 0.117°W

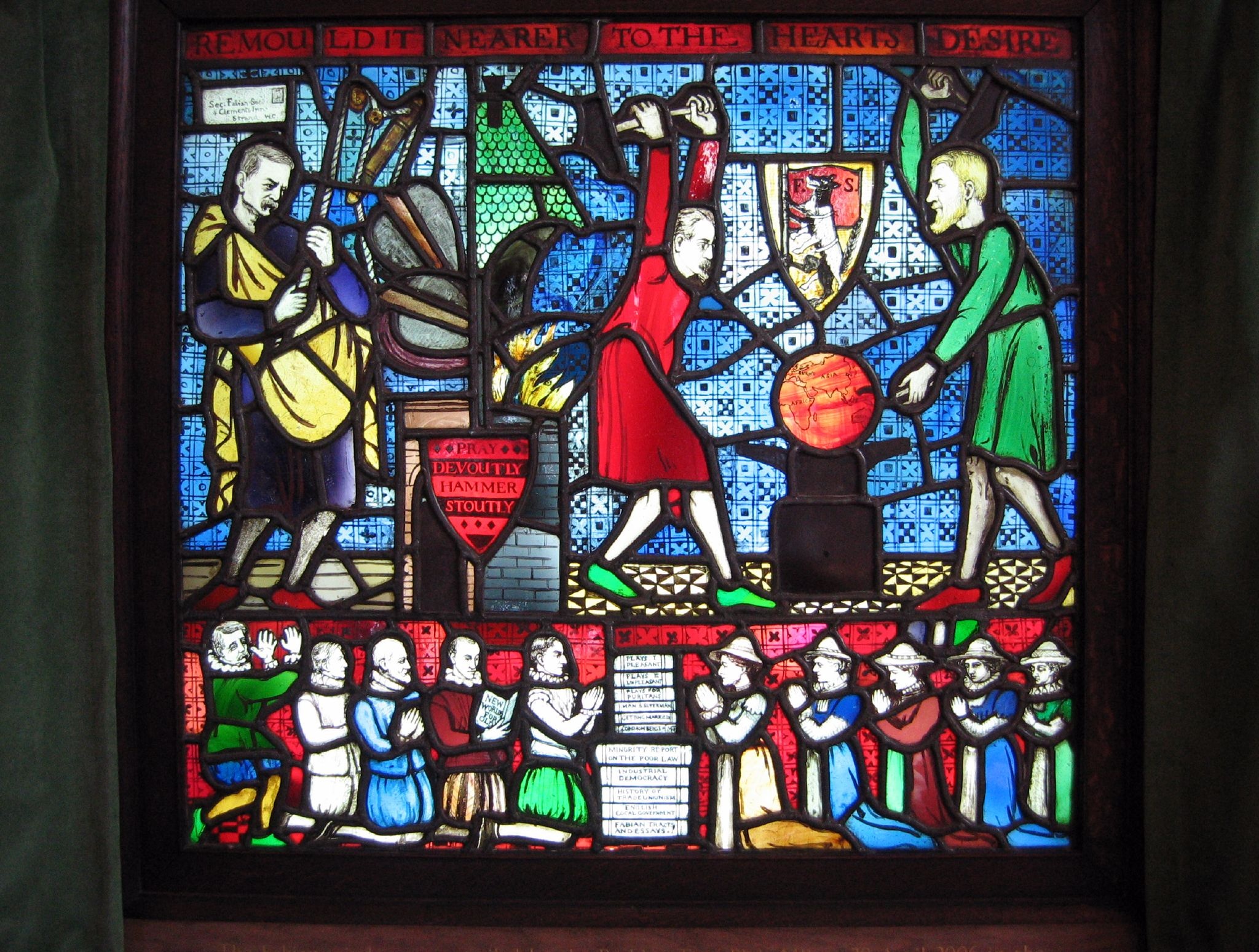
The Fabian Window

The Fabian Window is a stained-glass window depicting the founders of the Fabian Society, designed by George Bernard Shaw. The window was stolen from Beatrice Webb House in Dorking in 1978 and reappeared at Sotheby's in 2005. It was restored to display in the Shaw Library at the London School of Economics (LSE) in 2006 at a ceremony presided over by then-Prime Minister Tony Blair, emphasising New Labour's intellectual debt to the Fabians.

== Design and construction ==
The stained glass window was designed by George Bernard Shaw in 1910 as a commemoration of the Fabian Society. Sue Donnelly, former archivist at the London School of Economics, describes the window as:

[I]n the style of a Tudor family memorial. At the top Sidney Webb and Shaw himself are shown hammering out a new world on an anvil beneath an emblem of a wolf in sheep’s clothing reflecting the Society’s gradualist approach. On their left the secretary of the Fabian Society, Edward Pease is working the bellows and below are the smaller figures of active members of the Fabian Society.

Four Fabians – Beatrice and Sidney Webb, Graham Wallas, and Bernard Shaw – founded the London School of Economics with the money left to the Fabian Society by Henry Hutchinson. Supposedly the decision was made at a breakfast party on 4 August 1894. Artist Caroline Townshend (cousin of Shaw's wife Charlotte Payne-Townshend and daughter of Fabian and Suffragette Emily Townshend) created the window according to Shaw's design in 1910. Also included in the window besides Shaw and Townshend themselves were other prominent Fabians such as H. G. Wells, Annie Besant, Hubert Bland, E. Nesbit, Sydney Olivier, Oliver Lodge, Leonard Woolf, Emmeline Pankhurst and Mrs Boyd Dawson.

For whatever reason, Shaw never collected the window from Townshend's workshop. The belief is that it remained there until 1947, when Townsend's niece Eva Bourne, also a stained glass artist, presented it to Beatrice Webb House in Holmbury St Mary, near Dorking. This was the year the house was formally opened by the Webb Memorial Trust as a conference and educational venue for the Labour Party and the Fabian Society, officially opened by Clement Attlee, who also unveiled the Fabian Window at LSE, having been a former lecturer.

== Theft and recovery ==
The window was subsequently stolen from the house in 1978 and surfaced in Phoenix, Arizona, soon after, but then disappeared again until it suddenly appeared for sale at Sotheby's in July 2005. The Webb Memorial Trust re-purchased it and have now loaned it to the London School of Economics to sit alongside the painting of LSE founders Sidney and Beatrice Webb by William Nicholson in the school's Shaw Library.

== Comments ==
=== Tony Blair ===
Tony Blair spoke about the remarkable way the Fabians influenced the Labour Party, not just in its creation but also in its economic, political and intellectual development.

Despite all the very obvious differences in policy and attitude and positioning... a lot of the values that the Fabians and George Bernard Shaw stood for would be very recognisable, at least I hope they would, in today's Labour party. One of the things I think they were best at was being utterly iconoclastic about the traditional thinking that governed our country and indeed constantly, whenever a piece of conventional wisdom came out, they questioned that conventional wisdom in its fundamentals, and did so with remarkable success.

=== Howard Davies ===
LSE director Howard Davies said: "It is a great honour for the School to have this piece of national heritage on campus. The window will be a visible reminder to students, staff and visitors of the School's historical links with Shaw, the Webbs and other Fabians, whose ideas continue to influence our thinking about society, economics and politics."
