= Statue of Samuel Johnson =

Statue in London, England

Coordinates: 51.5132°N 0.1135°W

Dr Samuel Johnson
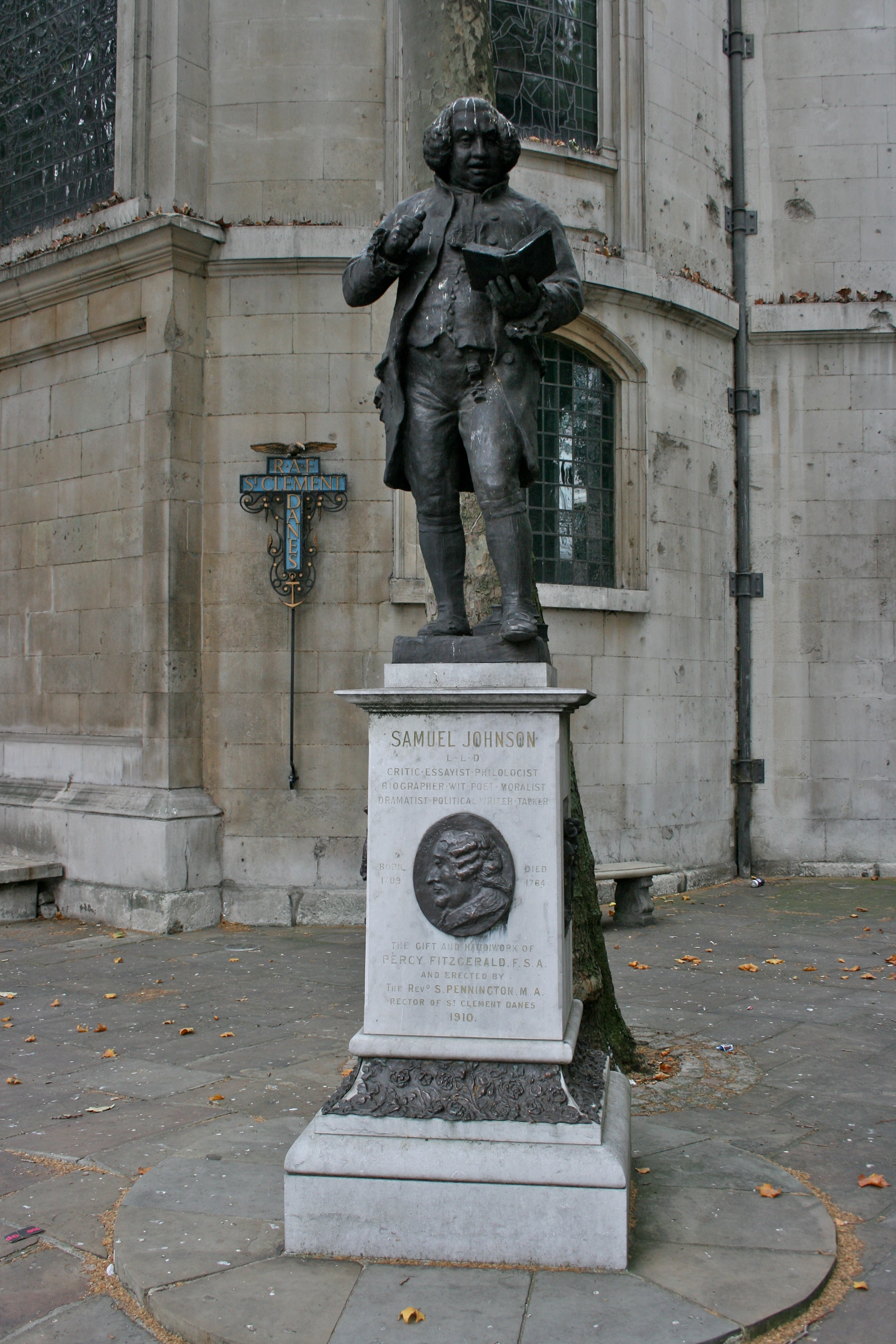
- Artist: Percy Hetherington Fitzgerald
- Completion date: 1910
- Subject: Samuel Johnson
- Location: London

Listed Building – Grade II
- Official name: Statue of Doctor Johnson in Churchyard at East End of St Clement Danes
- Designated: 24 February 1958
- Reference no.: 1237100

The statue of Samuel Johnson is a Grade II listed statue (1910) on the Strand in the churchyard of St Clement Danes church in London.

Samuel Johnson was a writer and lexicographer most famous for his dictionary, who lived and worked nearby on Fleet Street, a location renowned for its historic connection to print houses. It was in Dr Johnson's House in Gough Square that Johnson wrote his dictionary. The statue stands outside St Clement Danes which was frequented by Johnson.

The statue was designed by Percy FitzGerald and was inspired by a portrait of Johnson by Sir Joshua Reynolds. The statue shows Johnson with a full-bottomed wig and holding a book in his left hand with an inkwell at his feet. The front of the plinth on which he stands has a portrait in relief of his biographer James Boswell. In 1995 the book in Johnson's hand was stolen and replaced by a replica made by Faith Winter, who was also the sculptor of two statues at the western front of St Clement Danes.

A marble statue of Johnson stands inside St Paul's Cathedral, the first statue to be placed in the church.
