= Statue of Władysław Sikorski =

Statue in London, England

Coordinates: 51.5211°N 0.1454°W

Władysław Eugeniusz Sikorski
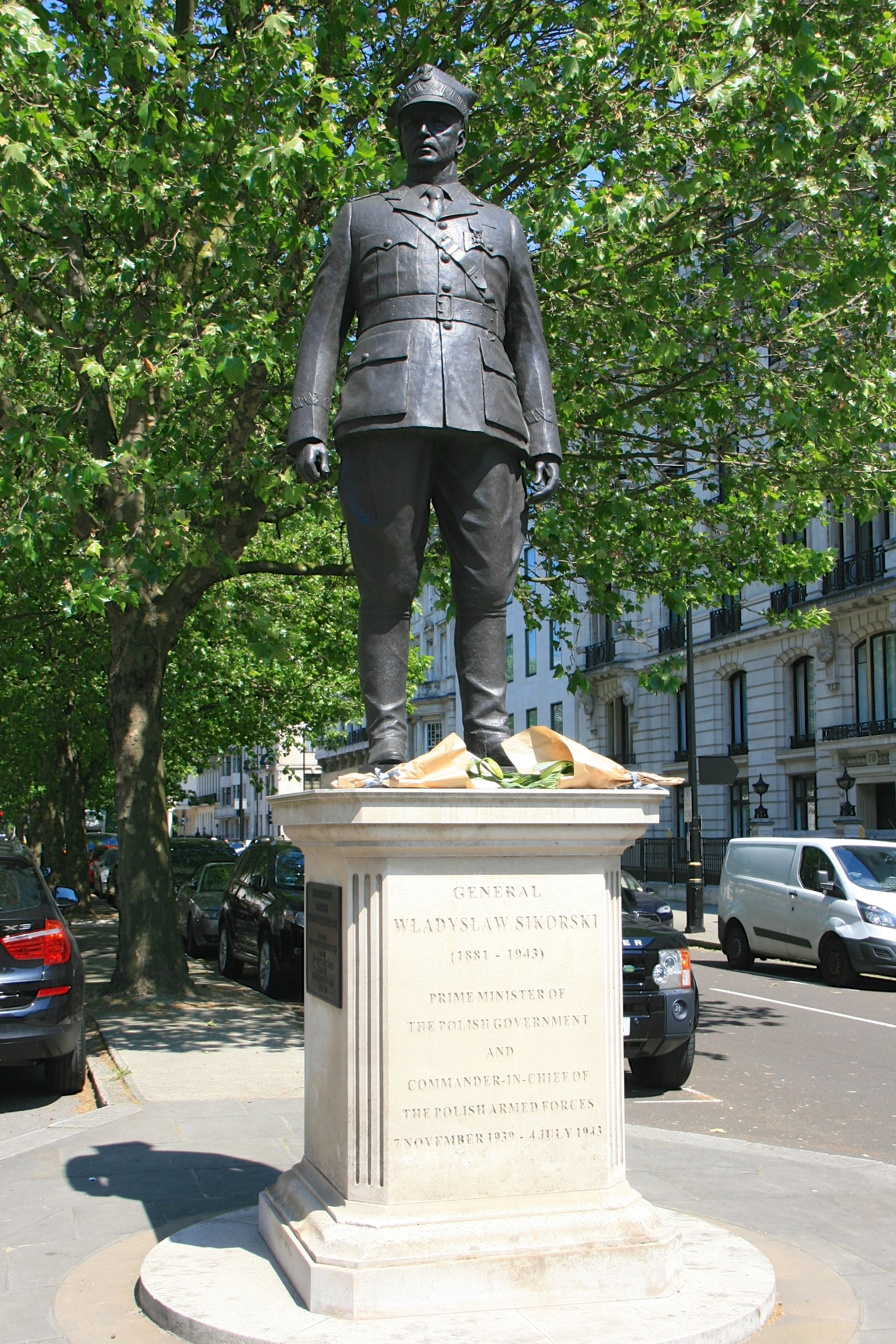
- Artist: Faith Winter
- Completion date: 2000
- Subject: Władysław Sikorski
- Location: London

The statue of General Władysław Sikorski is a statue on Portland Place in London.

Władysław Sikorski served as the Prime Minister in exile of Poland during German occupation in the Second World War. He worked from the nearby Polish Embassy. He died in 1943 while returning from inspecting Polish troops in the Middle East.

The statue was designed by Faith Winter and unveiled in 2000 by the Duke of Kent. At the ceremony, the Duke read out a letter from Queen Elizabeth the Queen Mother recalling her and George VI's fond impression of Sikorski. The statue's inscription also commemorates the Polish resistance and those that died fighting for the movement.
