= Shaw's Corner =

Writer's house museum in Ayot St Lawrence, Hertfordshire, England

Coordinates: 51.83434°N 0.26709°W

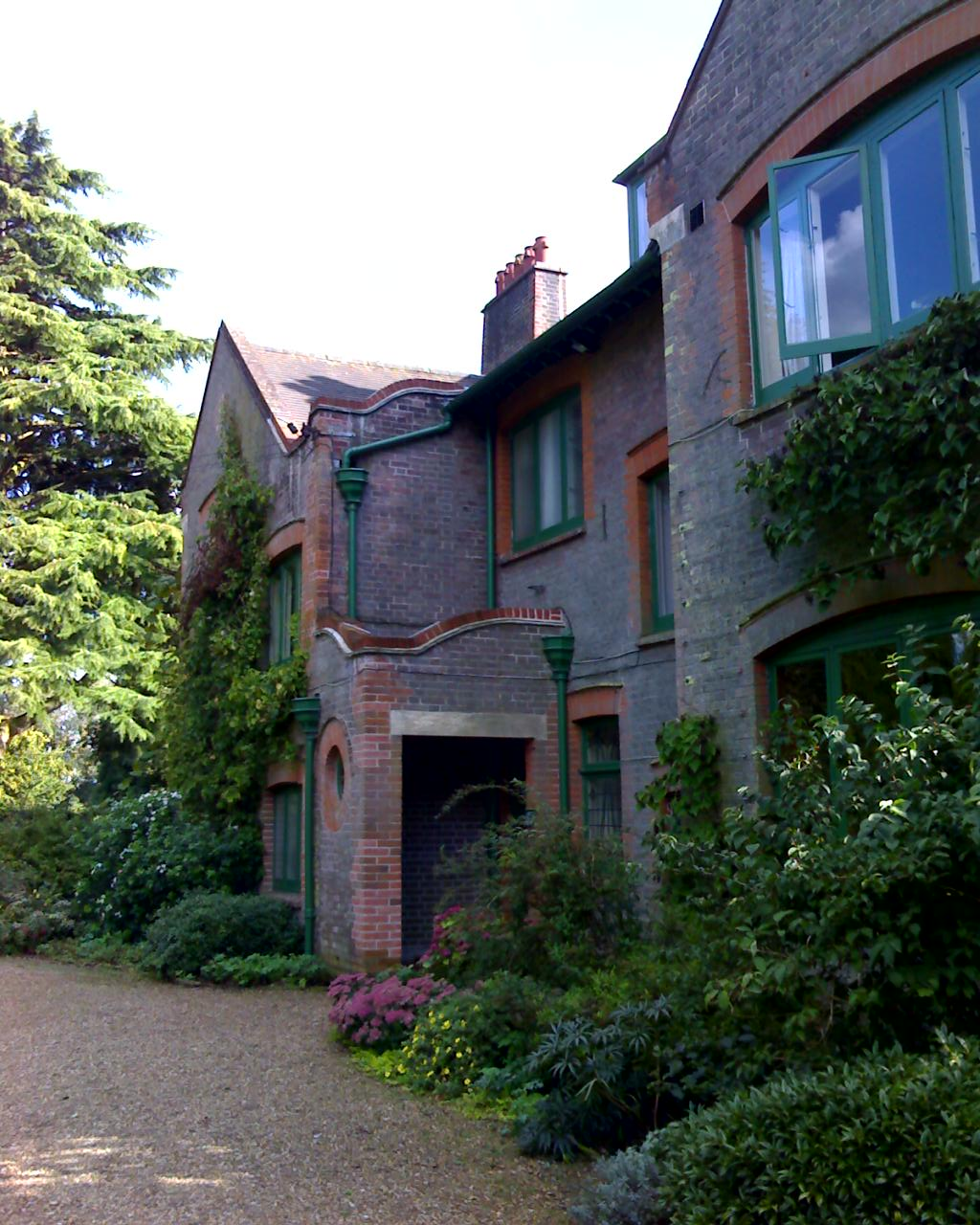
- The front of Shaw's Corner.
- Interactive map of Shaw's Corner
- Location: Ayot St Lawrence, near Welwyn Garden City, Hertfordshire, England, UK

History
- Built: Early 20th century

Site notes
- Architect(s): Smee, Mence & Houchin
- Architectural style: Arts and Crafts movement
- Governing body: National Trust

Listed Building – Grade II*
- Official name: Shaw's Corner
- Designated: 24 January 1967
- Reference no.: 1348110

Shaw's Corner was the primary residence of the renowned Irish playwright George Bernard Shaw; it is now a National Trust property open to the public as a writer's house museum. Inside the house, the rooms remain much as Shaw left them, and the garden and Shaw's writing hut can also be visited. The house is an Edwardian Arts and Crafts-influenced structure situated in the small village of Ayot St Lawrence, in Hertfordshire, England. It is 6 miles from Welwyn Garden City and 5 miles from Harpenden.

Built as the new rectory for the village during 1902, the house was the home of playwright George Bernard Shaw from 1906 until his death in 1950. It was designed by a local firm of architects, Smee, Mence & Houchin, and local materials were used in its construction. The Church of England decided that the house was too large for the size of the parish, and let it instead. Shaw and his wife Charlotte Payne-Townshend relocated in 1906, and eventually bought the house and its land in 1920, paying £6,220. At the same time the garden was extended and Shaw bought land from his friend Apsley Cherry-Garrard, bringing the total to 1.4 hectares (3.5 acres).

Shaw is known to have written many of his major works in a secluded, home-built revolving hut located at the bottom of his garden. The tiny structure of only 64 square feet (5.9 m^{2}), was built on a central steel-pole frame with a circular track so that it could be rotated on its axis to follow the arc of the Sun's light during the day. Shaw dubbed the hut "London", so that unwanted visitors could be told he was unavailable as he was away “in London”.

After Shaw's and his wife's deaths, their ashes were taken to Shaw's Corner, mixed and then scattered along footpaths and around the statue of Saint Joan in their garden. In 1967 the house was designated a Grade II* listed building.

== Gallery ==
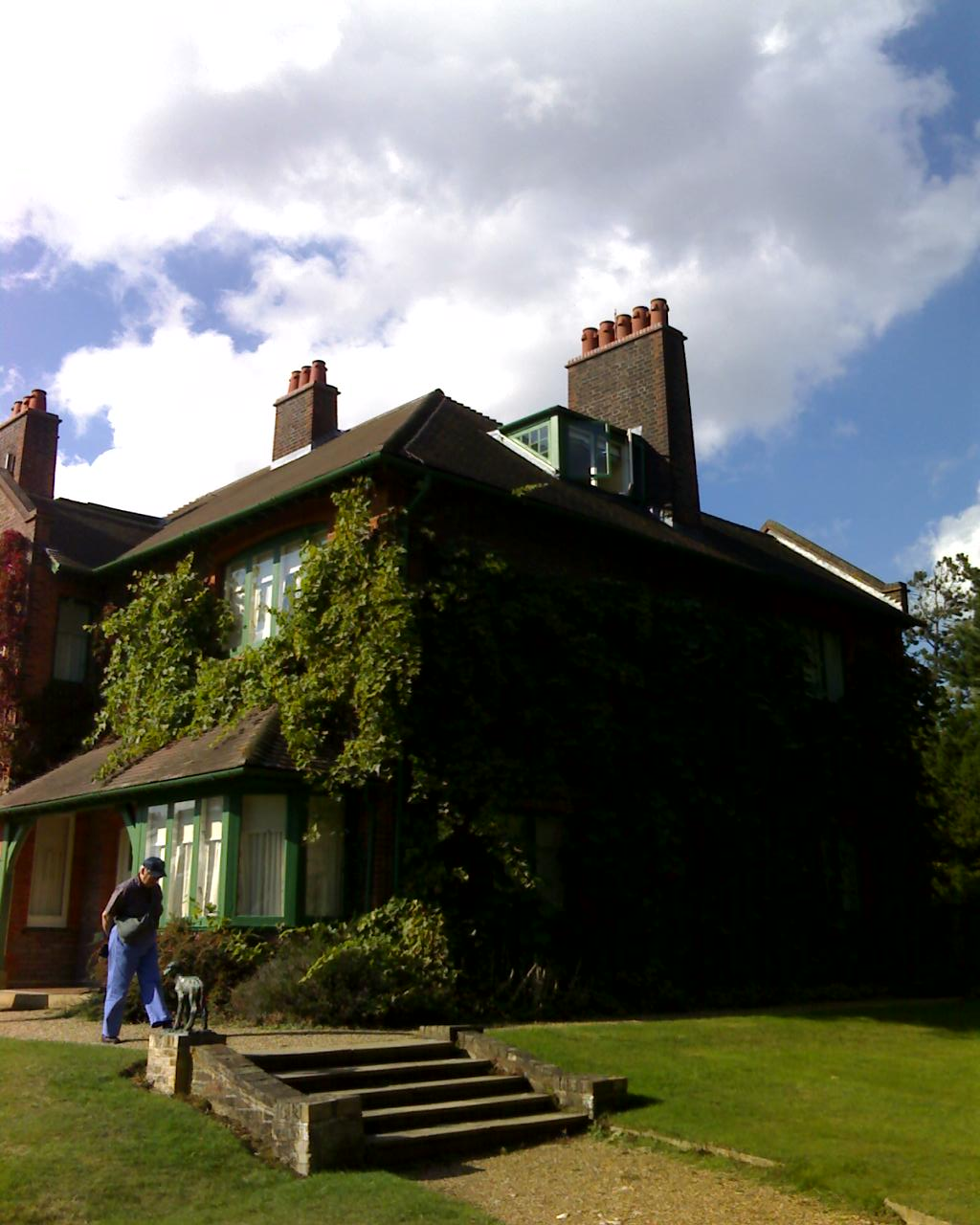
Shaw's Corner from the garden

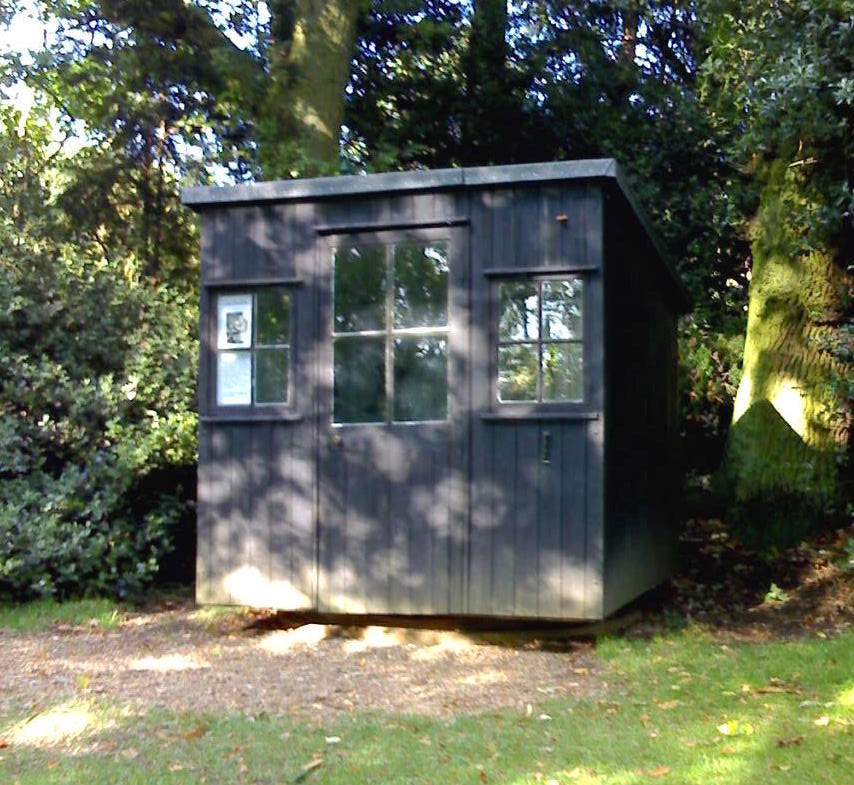
Shaw's writing hut

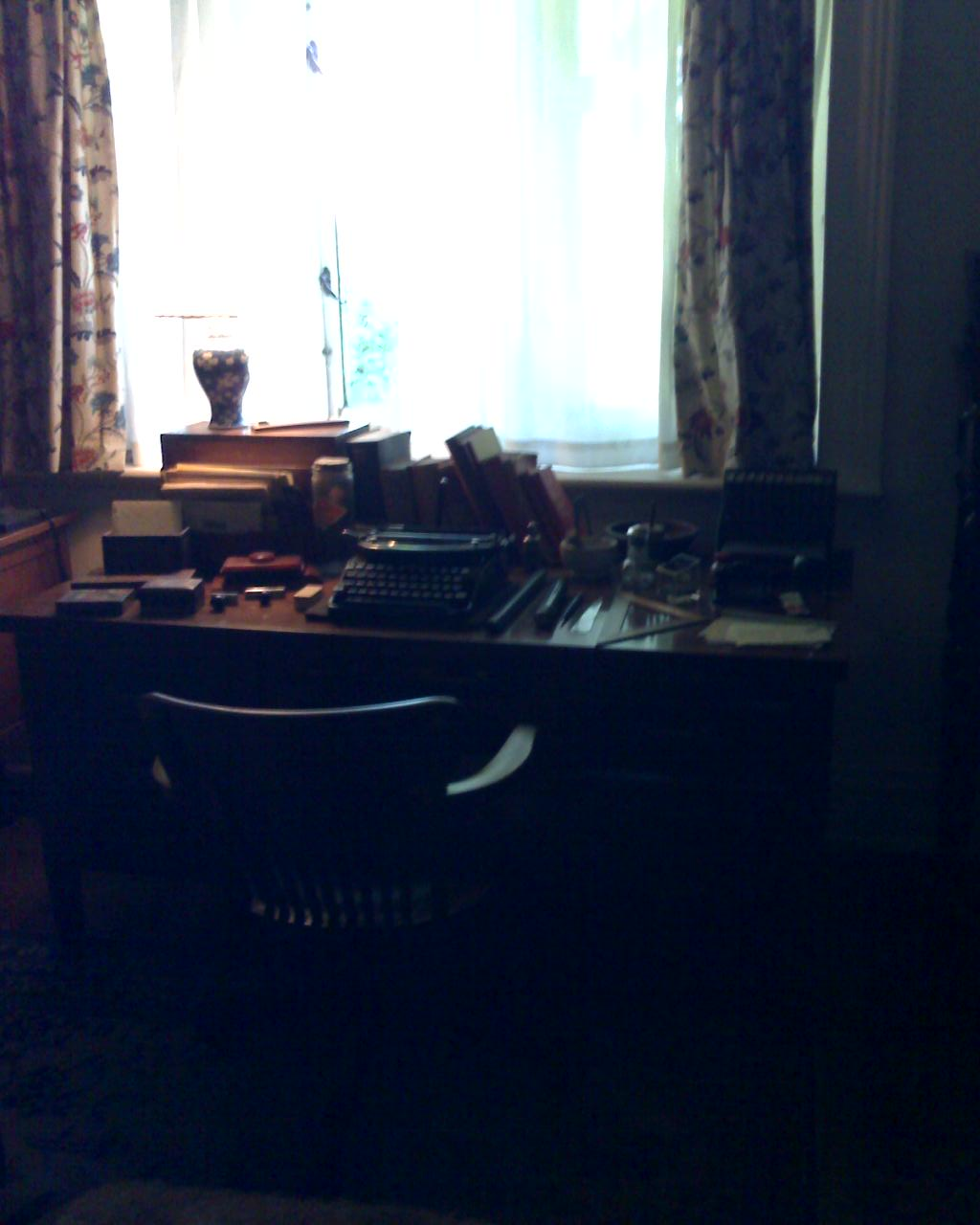
Shaw's study

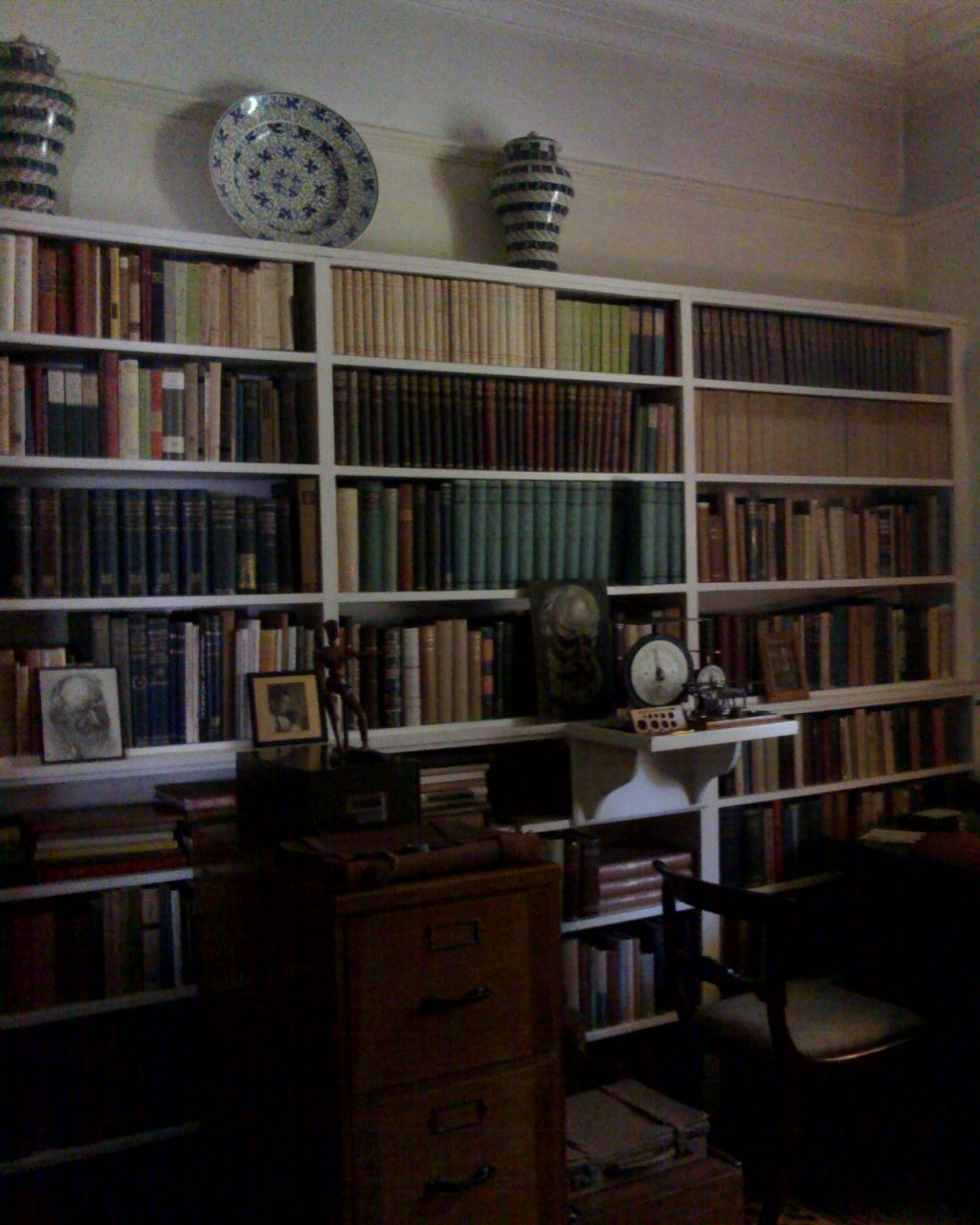
Another view of Shaw's study

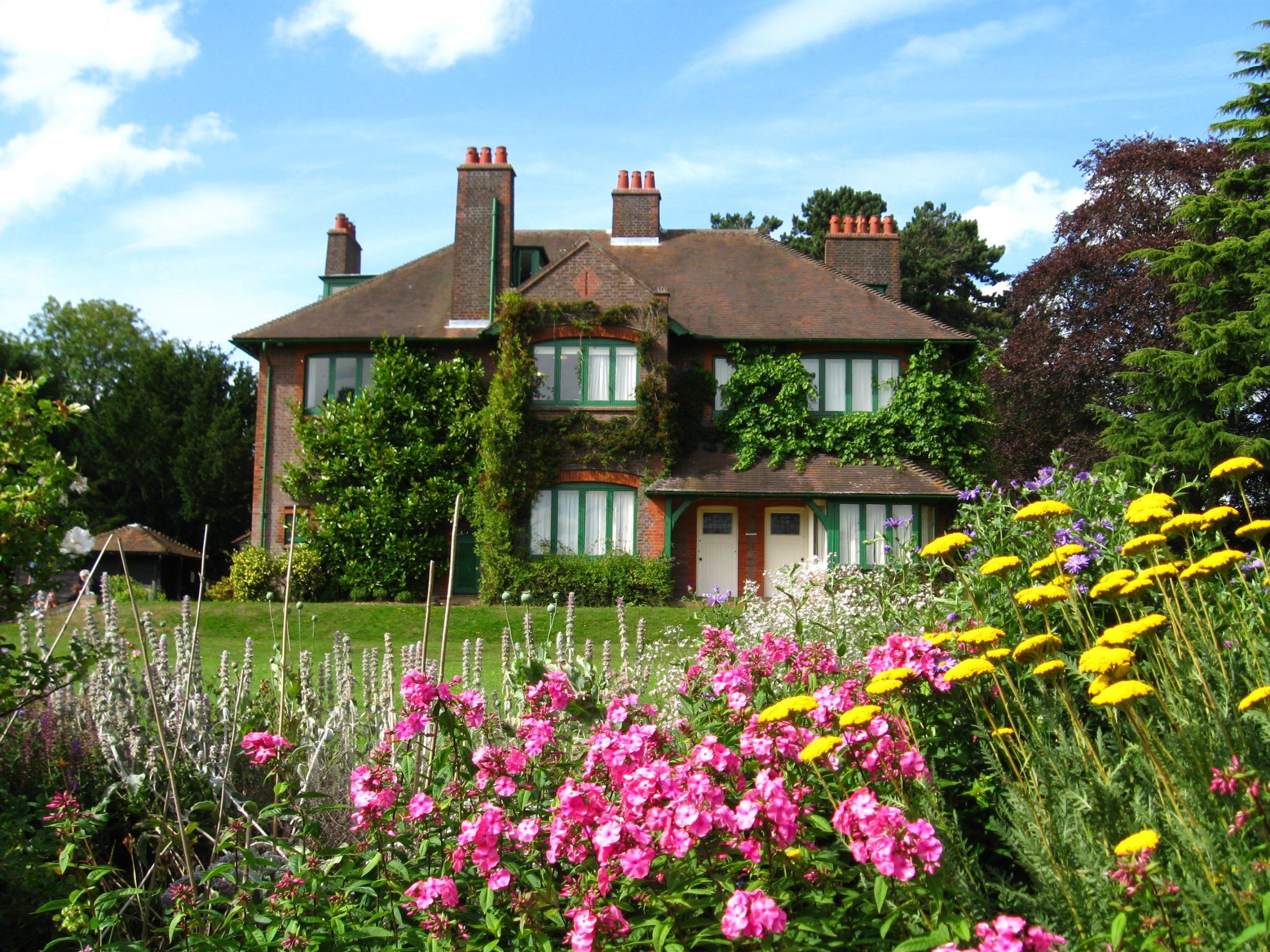
Garden
