= David Winter (sculptor) =

British sculptor

- Born: David Frederick Spencer Winter; 18 December 1958; Catterick, North Yorkshire, England
- Occupation: Sculptor
- Years active: 1979–2010
- Parent(s): Freddie Winter; Faith Winter

David Winter (born 1958 in Catterick, Yorkshire, England) is an English sculptor known for collectible miniature buildings.

Winter made his first cottage in 1979 with John Hine, and soon expanded. David Winter Cottages, which became popular for its small, collectible detailed cottages, some of which were rare. Originally sold for around £10, many became much more valuable as their popularity grew. They were popular in the late 1980s and in 1991, one was sold for $42,000 and a collection of 146 was sold for $200,000. The cottages were popular in the United States, where a David Winter Cottages Collectors Guild had 200,000 members in the early 1990s.

Production ceased in 2002 or 2003.

In 2007, one newspaper reported that while collectibles were not as valuable as in the past, David Winter Cottages were still valuable.
