= LSE Shaw Library =

Coordinates: 51.514°N 0.117°W

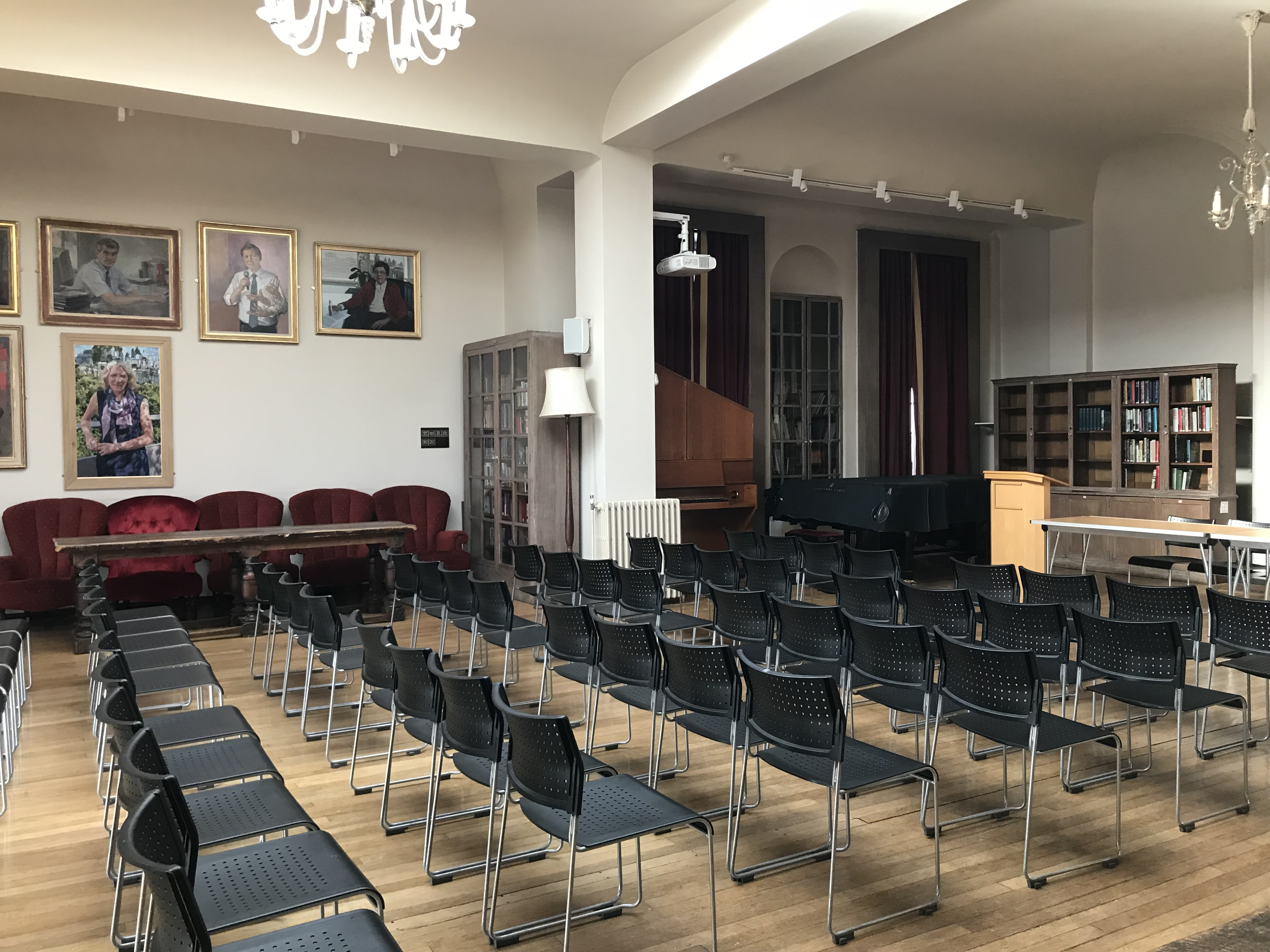
Shaw Library

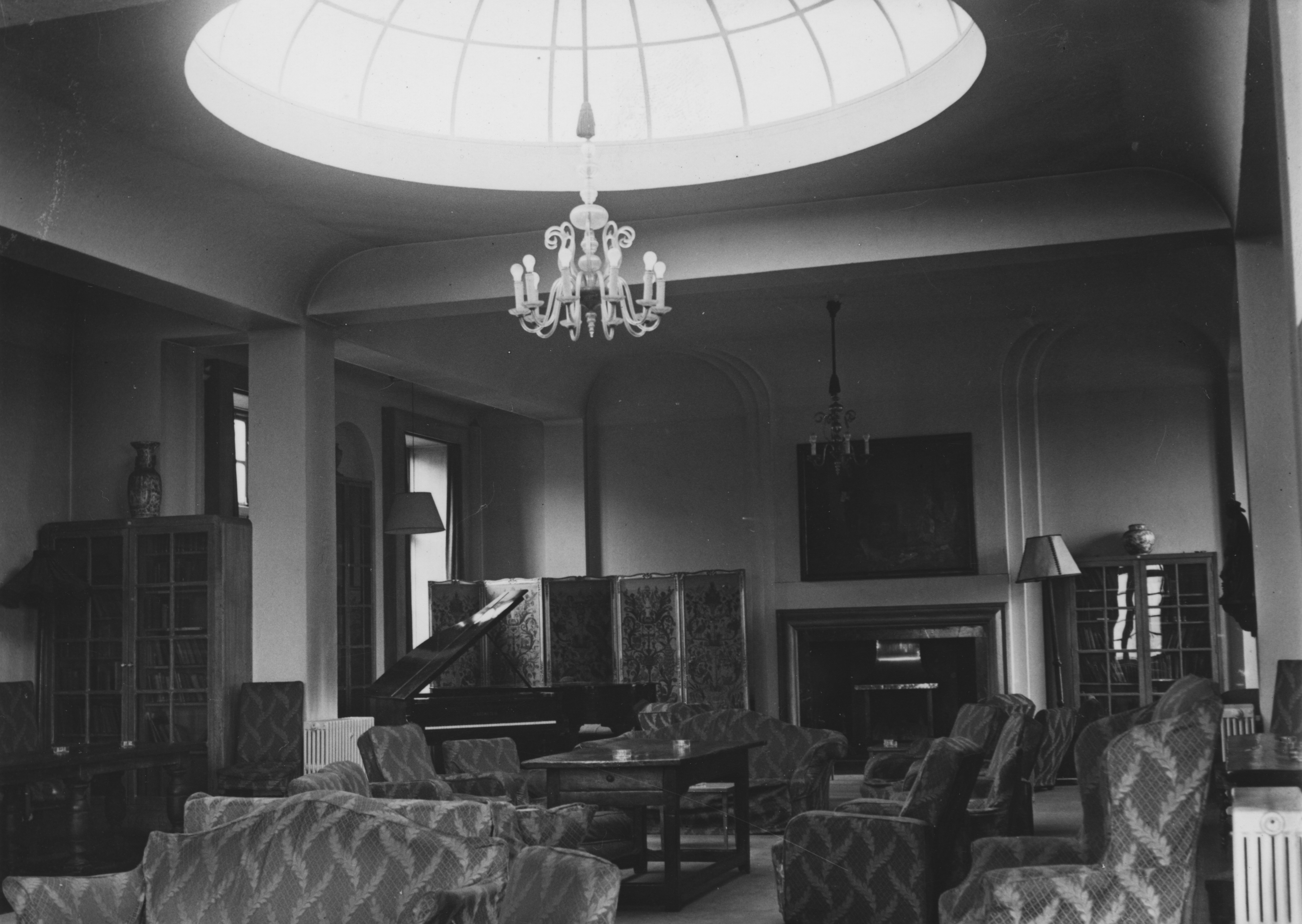
Shaw Library in the 1950s

The Shaw Library, or the Founder's Room, is a general-purpose library and a common room at the London School of Economics and Political Science. Located on the sixth floor of the Old Building, the library is accessible to all members of the university. It was founded by and named after Charlotte Payne-Townshend Shaw, wife of the playwright George Bernard Shaw.

The library includes the Fabian Window, a stained-glass window designed by George Bernard Shaw.

== See also ==
- British Library of Political and Economic Science
