= Statue of Hugh Dowding =

Statue in London, England

Coordinates: 51.5129°N 0.1143°W

The Lord Dowding
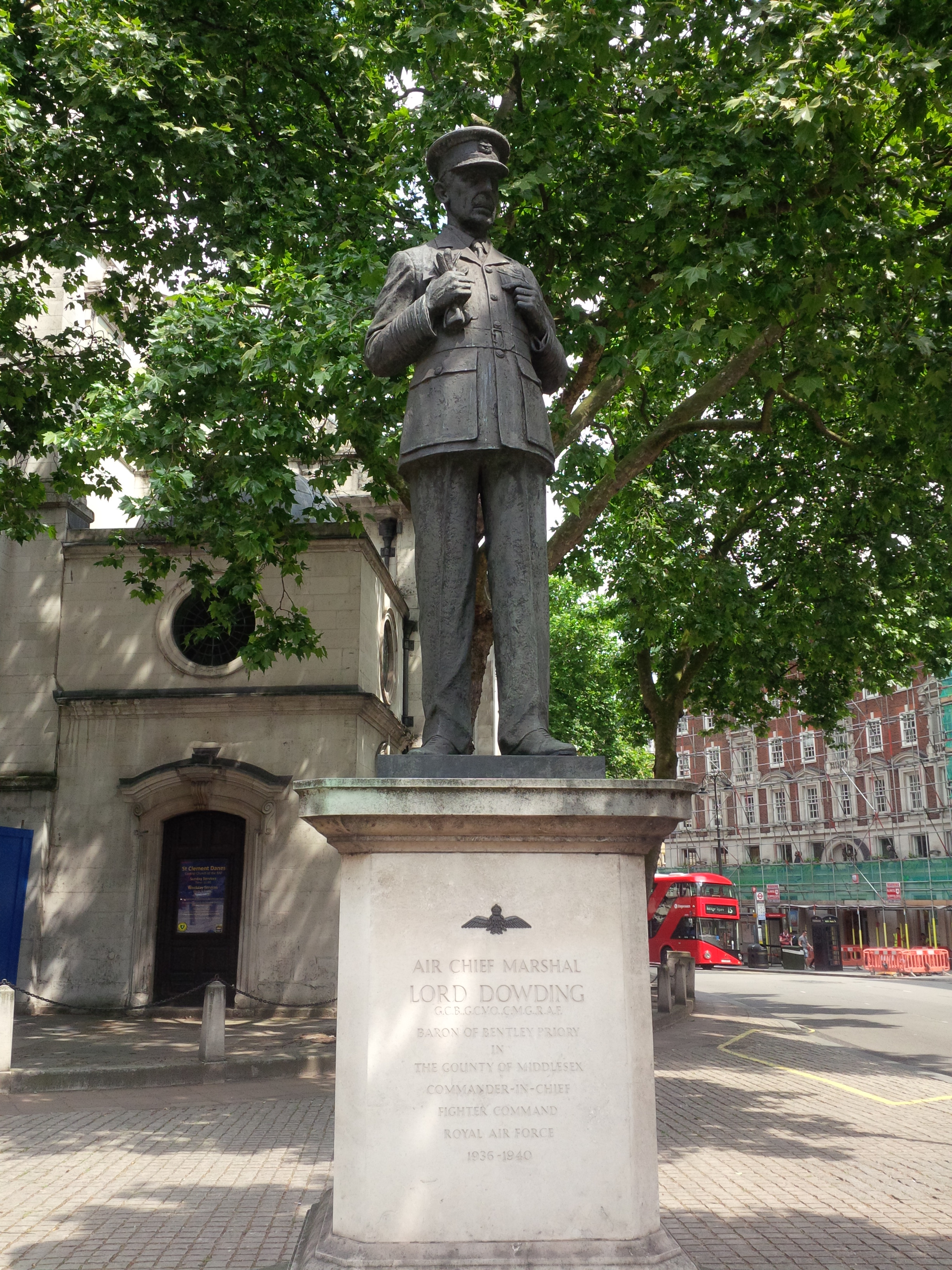
- Artist: Faith Winter
- Completion date: 1988
- Subject: Hugh Dowding
- Location: London

The statue of Hugh Dowding is one of three statues outside the front of St Clement Danes church on the Strand in London. It is one of a pair by the sculptor Faith Winter, the other being a statue of Arthur Harris.

Hugh Dowding was an air marshal during the Second World War who commanded the Royal Air Force in the defence of London during the Battle of Britain. Dowding was well respected by those who worked under him, whom Winston Churchill called "Dowding's chicks". The site in front of St Clement Danes is significant in that the church was bombed out during the war, and its reconstruction and reconsecration in 1958 saw it become a monument of remembrance for those of the RAF who had fallen during the war.

The statue was designed by Faith Winter, was modelled directly in plaster, and was unveiled by Queen Elizabeth the Queen Mother in 1988 with a single Spitfire flypast. The statue portrays Dowding in uniform, and his son Derek who had himself served during the Battle of Britain remarked that it was an "uncanny likeness" when it was first revealed.
