= Charlotte Payne-Townshend =

Irish political activist (1857–1943)

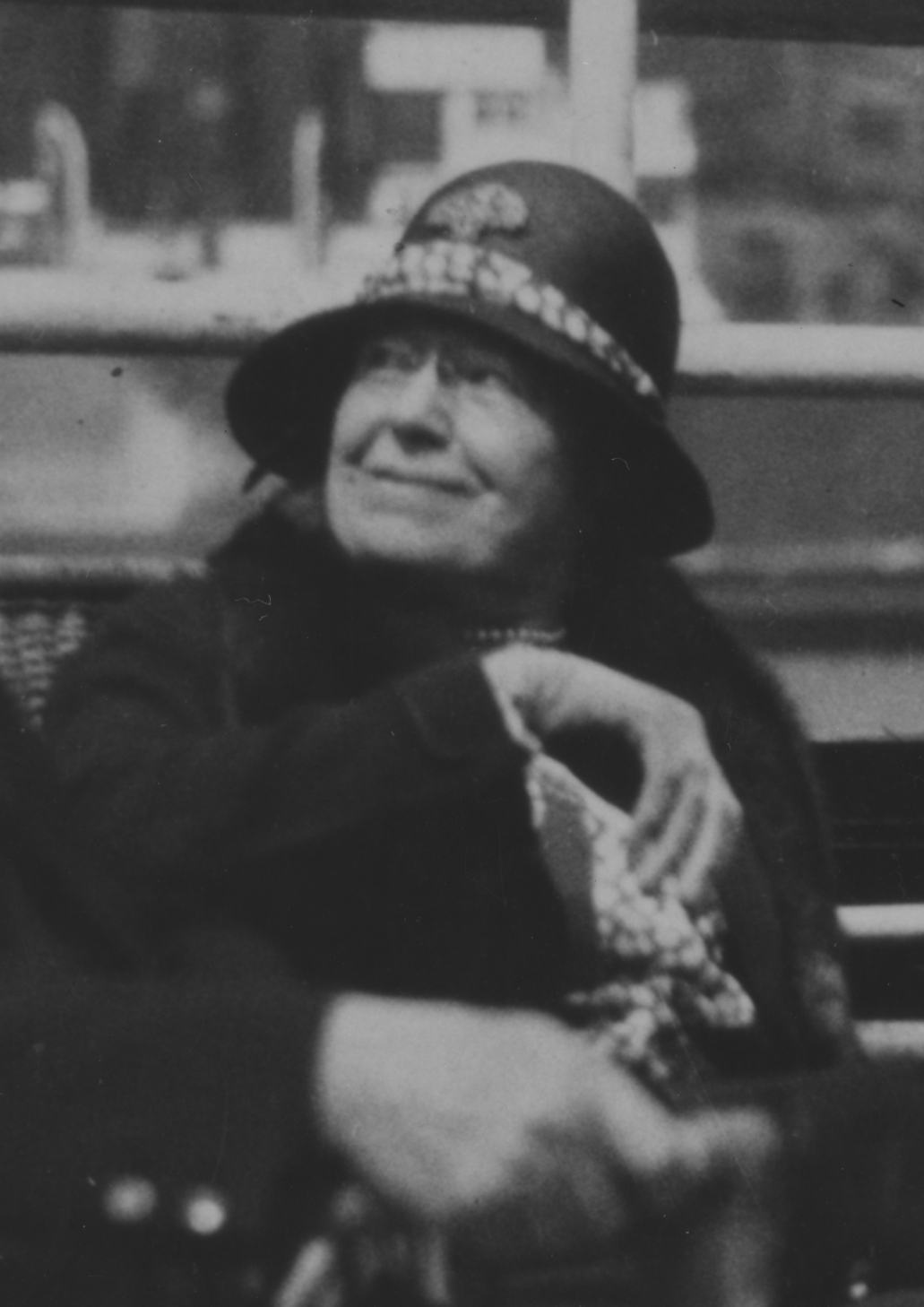
- Born: Charlotte Frances Payne-Townshend; 20 January 1857
- Died: 12 September 1943 (aged 86)
- Resting place: Shaw's Corner, Ayot St Lawrence
- Occupation: Political activist
- Spouse: George Bernard Shaw (m. 1898)

Charlotte Frances Payne-Townshend (20 January 1857 – 12 September 1943) was an Irish political activist in Britain. She was a member of the Fabian Society and was dedicated to the struggle for women's rights. She married the playwright George Bernard Shaw.

== Early life ==
Daughter of Horace Townshend, she grew up in a wealthy Irish family in County Cork before moving to England. Charlotte met Beatrice Webb in 1895. Webb described her as: "[a] large graceful woman with masses of chocolate brown hair ... She dresses well, in flowing white evening robes she approaches beauty. At moments she is plain." Her mother was determined to find her a husband. Charlotte later commented: "Even in my earliest years I had determined I would never marry." She turned down Count Sponnek, Finch Hutton and Arthur Smith-Barry. Charlotte fell in love with Axel Munthe, but he never asked for her hand in marriage.

Beatrice and Sidney Webb persuaded Charlotte to donate £1,000 to the London School of Economics library and the endowment of a woman's scholarship. Charlotte also joined the Fabian Society. Beatrice later commented:

By temperament she is an anarchist, feeling any regulation or rule intolerable, a tendency which has been exaggerated by her irresponsible wealth... She is a socialist and a radical, not because she understands the collectivist standpoint, but because she is by nature a rebel. She is fond of men and impatient of most women, bitterly resents her enforced celibacy but thinks she could not tolerate the matter-of-fact side of marriage. Sweet tempered, sympathetic and genuinely anxious to increase the world's enjoyment and diminish the world's pain.

According to Michael Holroyd, Webb developed a plan "to marry Charlotte off to" Graham Wallas, who worked at the London School of Economics. In January 1896, she invited Charlotte and Graham to their rented home in the village of Stratford St Andrew in Suffolk. However, Charlotte was bored by his company.

== Meeting Shaw ==
Beatrice Webb also invited George Bernard Shaw to stay and he took a strong liking to Charlotte. He wrote to Janet Achurch: "Instead of going to bed at ten, we go out and stroll about among the trees for a while. She, being also Irish, does not succumb to my arts as the unsuspecting and literal Englishwoman does; but we get on together all the better, repairing bicycles, talking philosophy and religion... or, when we are in a mischievous or sentimental humour, philandering shamelessly and outrageously." Beatrice wrote: "They were constant companions, pedaling round the country all day, sitting up late at night talking."

Shaw told Ellen Terry:

Kissing in the evening among the trees was very pleasant, but she knows the value of her unencumbered independence, having suffered a good deal from family bonds and conventionality before the death of her mother and the marriage of her sister left her free... The idea of tying herself up again by a marriage before she knows anything – before she has exploited her freedom and money power to the utmost.

When they returned to London, Charlotte sent an affectionate letter to Shaw. He replied:

Don't fall in love: be your own, not mine or anyone else's.... From the moment that you can't do without me, you're lost... Never fear: if we want one another we shall find it out. All I know is that you made the autumn very happy, and that I shall always be fond of you for that.

In July 1897, Charlotte proposed marriage. He rejected the idea because he was poor and she was rich and people might consider him a "fortune-hunter". He told Ellen Terry that the proposal was like an "earthquake" and he "with shuddering horror and wildly asked the fare to Australia". Charlotte decided to leave Shaw and went to live in Italy.

== Marriage ==
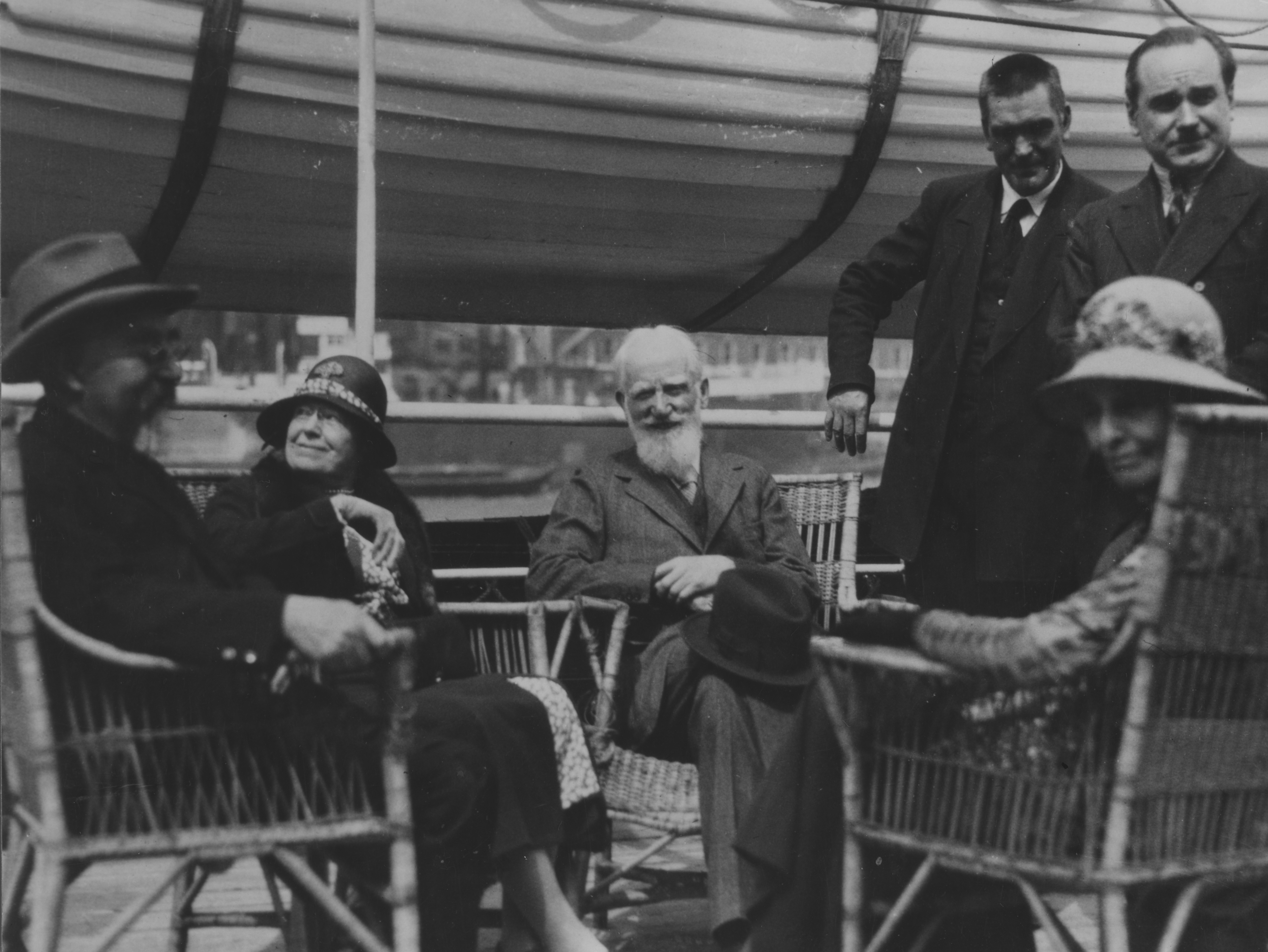
Charlotte and Bernard Shaw (centre) with Sidney Webb and Beatrice Webb (foreground)

In April 1898, Shaw had an accident; he was living at 29 Fitzroy Square with his mother. According to Shaw his left foot swelled up "to the size of a church bell". He wrote to Charlotte complaining that he was unable to walk. When she heard the news she travelled back to visit him at his home. Soon after she arrived on 1 May she arranged for him to go into hospital. Shaw had an operation that scraped the necrosed bone clean. Charlotte married Shaw on 1 June 1898, while he was recuperating from surgery. He was nearly forty-two; she was six months younger. The couple resided at first at 10 Adelphi Terrace, London, overlooking the Embankment. In the view of the biographer and critic St John Ervine, "their life together was entirely felicitous". Their marriage is generally believed never to have been consummated; whether this was wholly at Charlotte's wish, as Shaw liked to suggest, is less widely credited. However, according to Michael Holroyd they had a "careful sexual experience". Charlotte soon made herself almost indispensable to Shaw. She learnt to read his shorthand and to type, took dictation and helped him prepare his plays for the press.

In 1906, the couple moved into a house, now called Shaw's Corner, in Ayot St. Lawrence, a small village in Hertfordshire. They also maintained a pied-à-terre in Fitzroy Square, London, and travelled the world extensively during the 1930s. According to Shaw's friend Archibald Henderson Shaw's 1933 play A Village Wooing is based on their courtship. The play is about a writer and a woman who meet on a cruise but only become a couple when they develop a working relationship:

Like Charlotte, "Z" is an adventurous uninhibited young woman of the new dispensation, who knows what she wants, is breezily amusing in her frankness; and after "A" has come like a homing pigeon to the village and purchased the shop, plucks him like a daisy, as did Charlotte, who, as we recall, purchased the marriage license...The vision of marriage drawn by "A" is memorable as a literary facsimile of the "marital compact" for the fin-de-siècle union of the Shaws. The "romance" of the marriage of "A" and "Z" reveals consummation, not as mere sensual gratification of the senses, but as a mystic rite of sublimation, in the discovery of life's aesthetic magic and wonder.

She died from Paget's disease in 1943, and was cremated at Golders Green Crematorium, where her ashes were kept until Shaw's death in 1950. Their ashes were taken to Shaw's Corner, mixed and then scattered along footpaths and around the statue of Saint Joan in their garden.

== Publications ==
Payne-Townshend was also a translator. Among other things she translated Eugène Brieux's play Maternité for the London stage. It was put on by the Stage Society, at Daly's Theatre in 1910.

== Legacy ==
Shaw Library, on the sixth floor of the Old Building, London School of Economics, was founded by and named after her.

== Sources ==
- Adams, Elsie Bonita (1971). Bernard Shaw and the Aesthetes. Columbus: Ohio State University Press. ISBN 978-0-8142-0155-8.
- Carr, Pat (1976). Bernard Shaw. New York: Ungar. OCLC 2073986.
- Crawford, Fred D. (1993). "Shaw's British Inheritors". In Bertolini, John Anthony (ed.). Shaw and Other Playwrights. University Park: The Pennsylvania State University Press. ISBN 978-0-271-00908-7.
- Ervine, St John (1959). "Shaw, George Bernard (1856–1950)". Dictionary of National Biography Archive. doi:10.1093/odnb/9780192683120.013.36047. (subscription, Wikipedia Library access or UK public library membership required)
- Peters, Sally (1996). Bernard Shaw: The Ascent of the Superman. New Haven, CT: Yale University Press. ISBN 978-0-300-06097-3.
- Weintraub, Stanley (1982). The Unexpected Shaw. New York: Ungar. ISBN 978-0-8044-2974-0.
