= Percy Hetherington Fitzgerald =

Percy Hetherington Fitzgerald

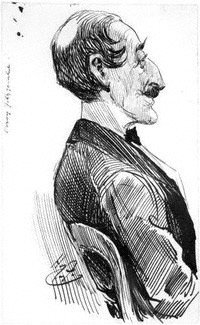
Fitzgerald caricatured by Harry Furniss c.1890

Percy Hetherington Fitzgerald (26 April 1830 (Note: Some sources state, incorrectly, that Fitzgerald was born in 1834.) – 24 November 1925) was an Anglo-Irish author and critic, painter and sculptor.

Fitzgerald was born in Ireland at Fane Valley, County Louth, the son of Thomas FitzGerald. He was educated at Belvedere college Dublin, Stonyhurst College, Lancashire, and at Trinity College, Dublin. He was called to the Irish bar and was for a time crown prosecutor on the northeastern circuit.

After moving to London, he became a contributor to Charles Dickens's magazine, Household Words, and later dramatic critic for the Observer and the Whitehall Review. Among his many writings are numerous biographies and works relating to the history of the theatre. He wrote:

- Life of Sterne (1864) (See Sterne.); 2nd edition; revised & enlarged (1896); reprinted 1904
- Charles Lamb (1866) (See Charles Lamb.)
- Life of David Garrick (1868) (See David Garrick.)
- The Kembles (1871)
- The Romance of the English Stage (1874)
- Croker’s Boswell and Boswell: Studies in the “Life of Johnson” (Chapman and Hall, 1880)
- Life of George IV (1881) (See George IV.)
- A New History of the English Stage (1882)
- Recreations of a Literary Man (1882)
- Life and Times of William IV (1884) (See William IV.)
- Lives of the Sheridans (1886)
- The Book Fancier (1886)
- The Story of Bradshaw's Guide. London: The Leadenhall Press. 1890 – via Google Books.
- Life of James Boswell (of Auchinleck) with an Account of His Sayings, Doings, and Writings (1891) (See James Boswell.)
- Henry Irving: A Record of Twenty Years at the Lyceum (1893)
- The Savoy Opera and the Savoyards (1894) (deals with operas of Gilbert and Sullivan.)
- Memoirs of an Author (London, 1895)
- A Critical Examination of Dr G. Birkbeck Hill's "Johnsonian" Editions (1898)
- The Good Queen Charlotte (1899)
- The Garrick Club (1904)
- Life of Charles Dickens (1905)
- Sir Henry Irving, A Biography (1906)
- "Boswell's Autobiography". The Quarterly Review. 214: 24–44. January 1911.
- Boswell's Autobiography (1912)
- Memories of Charles Dickens (1913)
- Worldlyman (1914)

In 1900 he completed a bust of his friend Charles Dickens, which can be seen in the Pump Room in Bath. In 1910 he created a statue of Samuel Johnson (Reference), which is standing behind St Clement Danes, Strand, London. (Photo)

He is buried at Glasnevin Cemetery, Dublin.
