= Statue of Arthur Harris =

Statue in London, England

Coordinates: 51.5131°N 0.1144°W

Sir Arthur Harris
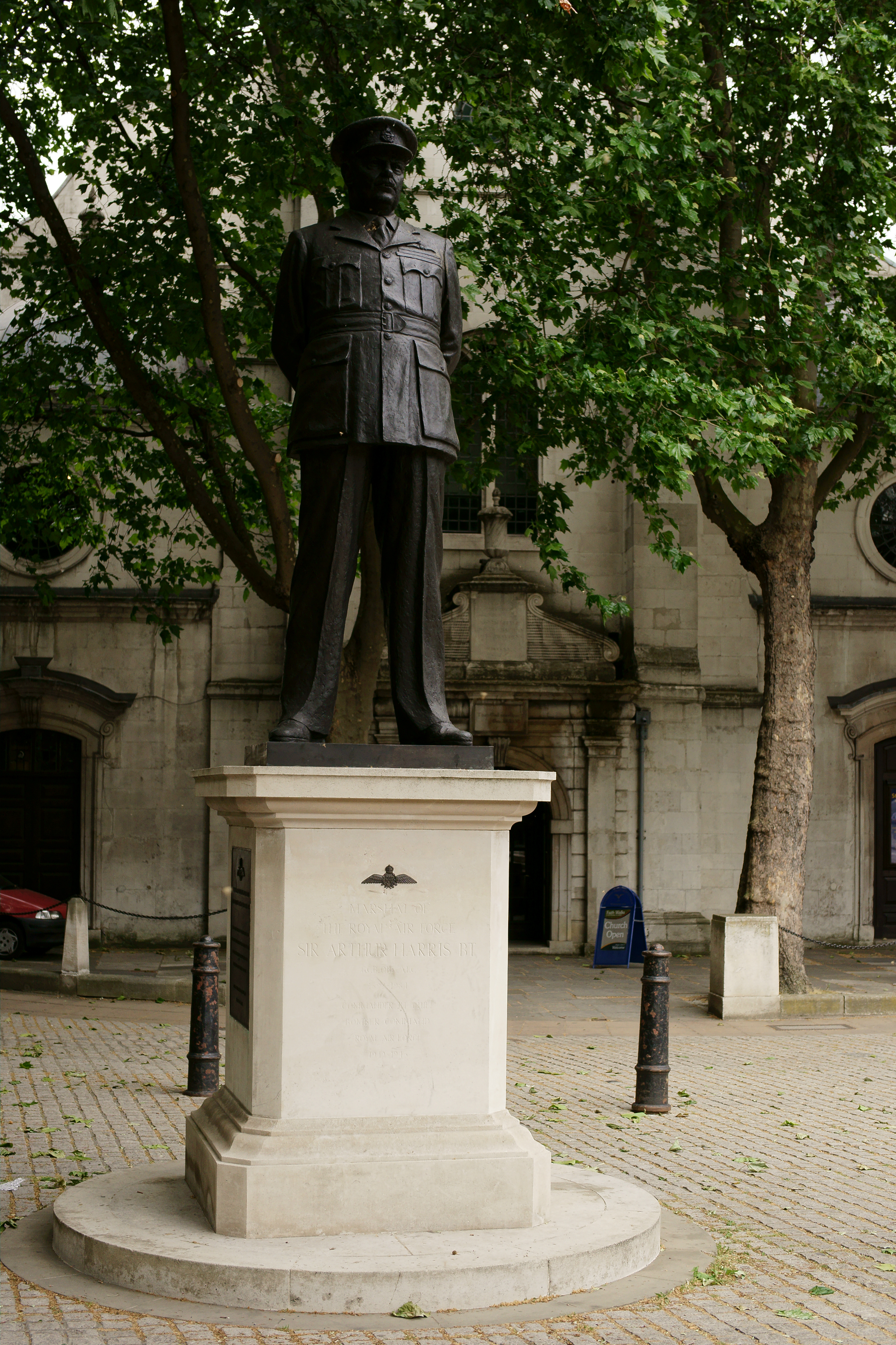
- Artist: Faith Winter
- Completion date: 1992
- Subject: Arthur Harris
- Location: London

The statue of Arthur Harris is one of three statues outside the front of St Clement Danes church on the Strand in London. It is one of two by the sculptor Faith Winter, the other being a statue of Hugh Dowding.

Harris served as Commander-in-Chief of RAF Bomber Command during the Second World War, earning him the nickname "Bomber Harris". During this time he led air raids on many German cities. His participation in the Bombing of Dresden, a controversial event, led to the statue commemorating him being caught up in controversy of its own. The unveiling of the statue saw protests and the statue has faced vandalism on numerous occasions.

The statue was funded by the Bomber Command Association; it was commissioned in 1989 and was completed three years later on the centenary of Harris's birth. St Clement Danes was chosen as the site alongside the statue to Dowding as St Clement Danes had largely been gutted by bomb damage during the war. After its reconstruction and 1958 reconsecration, it has served as a place of remembrance for members of the RAF who died fighting in the war.
