= Frances Boyd Dawson =

Frances Elizabeth Boyd Dawson (1871 – 1926) was a British social activist.

Born Frances Elizabeth Milner at Fulwood, Lancashire, in 1871, her father, a banker's clerk, died when she was ten years old. She was living in Lancaster in 1904, when she joined the Independent Labour Party. She qualified as a sanitary inspector, and moved to Reading, Berkshire, where she was a founder member of the local Fabian Society in 1906. She also became the secretary of the Reading Women's Suffrage Society, and delivered lectures for the National Committee for the Prevention of Destitution.

She relocated to London, and was known as Mrs Boyd Dawson after her marriage in 1909. In 1910, she was portrayed amongst others in the Fabian Window, a stained-glass window depicting leading members of the Fabian Society.

She was a founder member of the Fabian Women's Group, undertaking research for the Ministry of Labour. For two years she was Secretary of the Women's Industrial Council, and formulated plans for a Household Orderly Corps to end the drudgery and exploitation of women through domestic service. A long list of by-laws and suggestions were drawn up for those who wished to start a Household Orderly Corps in their own neighbourhood.

Her research article, The quality of maternity in relation to industrial occupations, published by the Women's Industrial Council in 1918, claimed, ‘There is practically nothing to choose in quality of maternity between women who go out to work and women who stay at home. Their children live or die in about equal numbers, their confinements are equally good or bad, their infants are born with an equal chance of survival.’

From 1919, she served on the executive of the Fabian Society. She was the author of the pamphlet Why Things cost more, published in the Citizen Series for Women, no. 1.

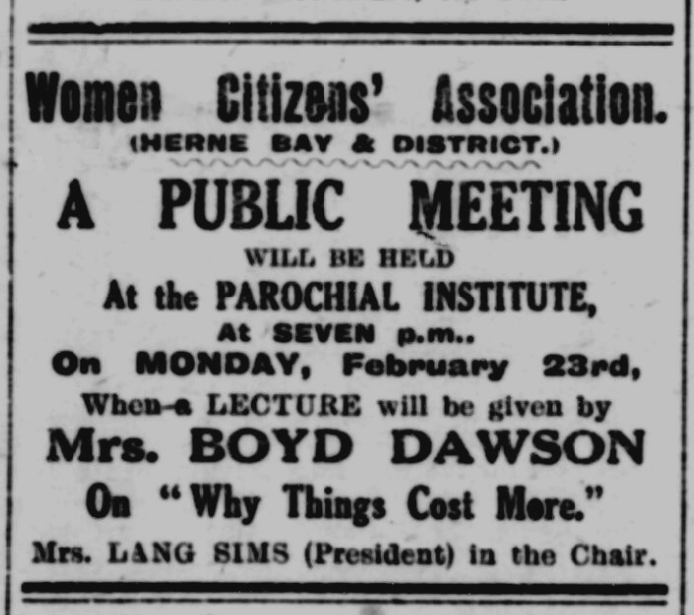
Herne Bay Press, 21 February 1920

She wrote a series of articles which were syndicated in a range of local newspapers around the UK. In C.3 children she contended that "it is quite impossible to make an A.1 population out of C.3 children, [those] who begin life handicapped by impaired constitutions". Between 1920 and 1922, Dawson campaigned and debated on behalf of various women's organisations, advocating state purchase of the whole licensed drink trade. This was seen as a realistic and achievable temperance and health measure in the post war period.

At High Wycombe in the mid-1920s, she was appointed as a Justice of the Peace as a nominee of the Buckinghamshire Federation of Trades Councils and Labour Parties. In the 1924 general election, she was the Labour Party’s election agent for the Wycombe constituency. She was a leading public speaker, and in 1921 and 1925 she stood as a Labour candidate for the Rural District Council and then the County Council, but without success.

Frances Elizabeth Dawson (Mrs Boyd Dawson) of Marseilles, France and of ‘Highway’, Hazlemere, High Wycombe, Bucks, died at Marseilles, France on 15 December 1926 at the age of 55 years.
