= British Library of Political and Economic Science =

Main library of the London School of Economics and Political Science

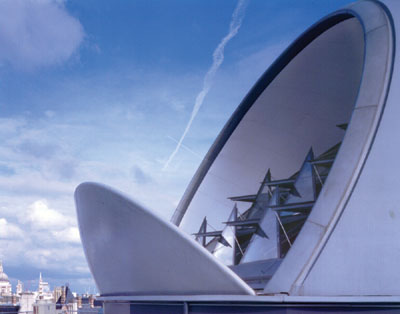
- The roof of the Lionel Robbins Building
- 51°30′52.5″N 0°06′56″W
- Location: Portugal Street, London WC2, United Kingdom
- Type: Academic library
- Established: 1896
- Architect: Norman Foster

Collection
- Items collected: Books, journals, newspapers, maps, official publications, pamphlets, microforms
- Size: 4M books, 33,600 journal titles
- Legal deposit: No

Access and use
- Circulation: 2.7M
- Members: 41,205

Other information
- Budget: £7.1M
- Director: Niamh Tumelty
- Employees: 96.6 FTE
- Affiliation: The London School of Economics (LSE)
- Website: http://www.lse.ac.uk/library

The British Library of Political and Economic Science, commonly referred to as "LSE Library", is the main library of the London School of Economics and Political Science (LSE). It is one of the largest libraries in the world devoted to the economic and social sciences. The Library responds to around 5,000 visits from students and staff each day. In addition, it provides a specialist international research collection, serving over 12,000 registered external users each year. It is housed in the Lionel Robbins Building.

== Location ==
The library is located on the London School of Economics (LSE) Campus, near Portugal Street. The current building is the former headquarters and warehouse facilities of WH Smith, opened in 1916 and taken over by LSE in 1976, to be reopened as a library in 1978.

== History ==
The Library was founded in 1896, one year after the LSE. It was founded in order to "provide, for the serious student of administrative and constitutional problems, what has hitherto been lacking in this country, namely a collection of the materials for economic and political research". A history of its development and collections is available on its institutional repository, LSE Research Online.

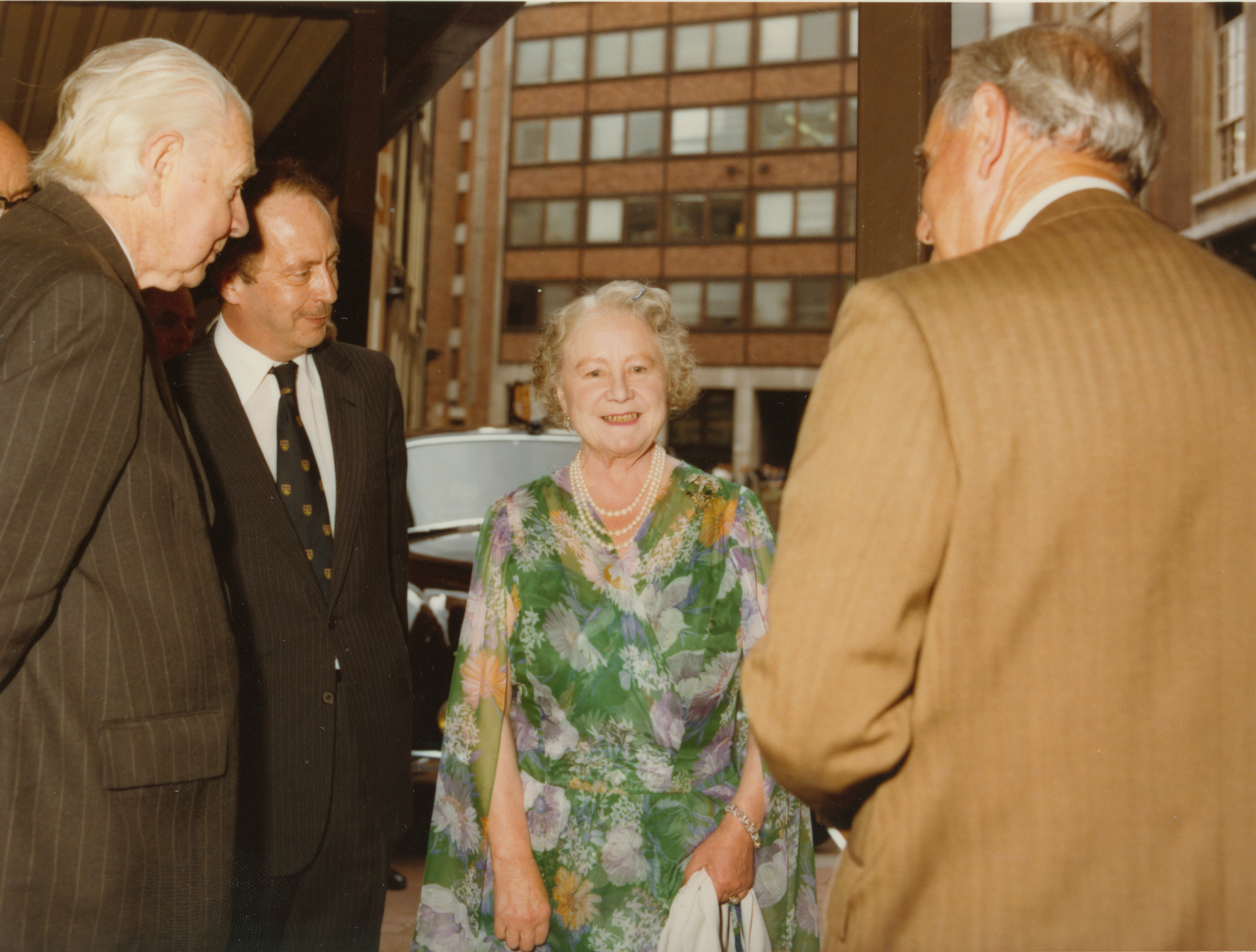
Formal opening of the new library in the Lionel Robbins Building, 1979

== Collections ==
Since its foundation the library has been the national social sciences library of the United Kingdom, and collects material on a worldwide basis in all major European languages. Over 50 km of shelving, enough to stretch the length of the Channel Tunnel, houses over four and a half million items including 31,000 past and present journal titles. The Library subscribes to approximately 15,000 e-journals as part of its electronic information provision. It has been designated as a United Nations depository library, providing a comprehensive collection of UN publications and documents. Many other organisations are also represented, including OECD (Organisation for Economic Co-operation and Development), ILO (International Labour Organization), OAS (Organization of American States) and GATT/WTO (General Agreement on Tariffs and Trade / World Trade Organization). It is also a European Documentation Centre and has received publications from the European Community since 1964. Its collections have been recognised for their national and international importance and awarded 'Designation' status by the Museums, Libraries and Archives Council (MLA).

The library's archives hold a number of unique collections. These include Charles Booth's poverty maps, which were awarded UNESCO status in 2016 on the Memory of the World Register. It also holds a number of other archive collections of national or international significance, such as The Women's Library, LGBT activism, British politics and early left wing thought, and peace campaigning.

The Library makes collections freely available online through its open access platforms. These include LSE Digital Library, which holds digitised and born-digital items from its collections, and LSE Research Online, which contains outputs such as publications, theses and research datasets. The open access press LSE Press was launched in 2018 and publishes peer-reviewed open access research in the social sciences through books and journals (LSE Public Policy Review, Journal of Illicit Economies and Development, and Journal of Long-Term Care). Student work is published through the Houghton Street Press imprint. The Library holds a free exhibition space which showcases some of its unique collections, with three termly exhibitions each year.

== Redevelopment ==
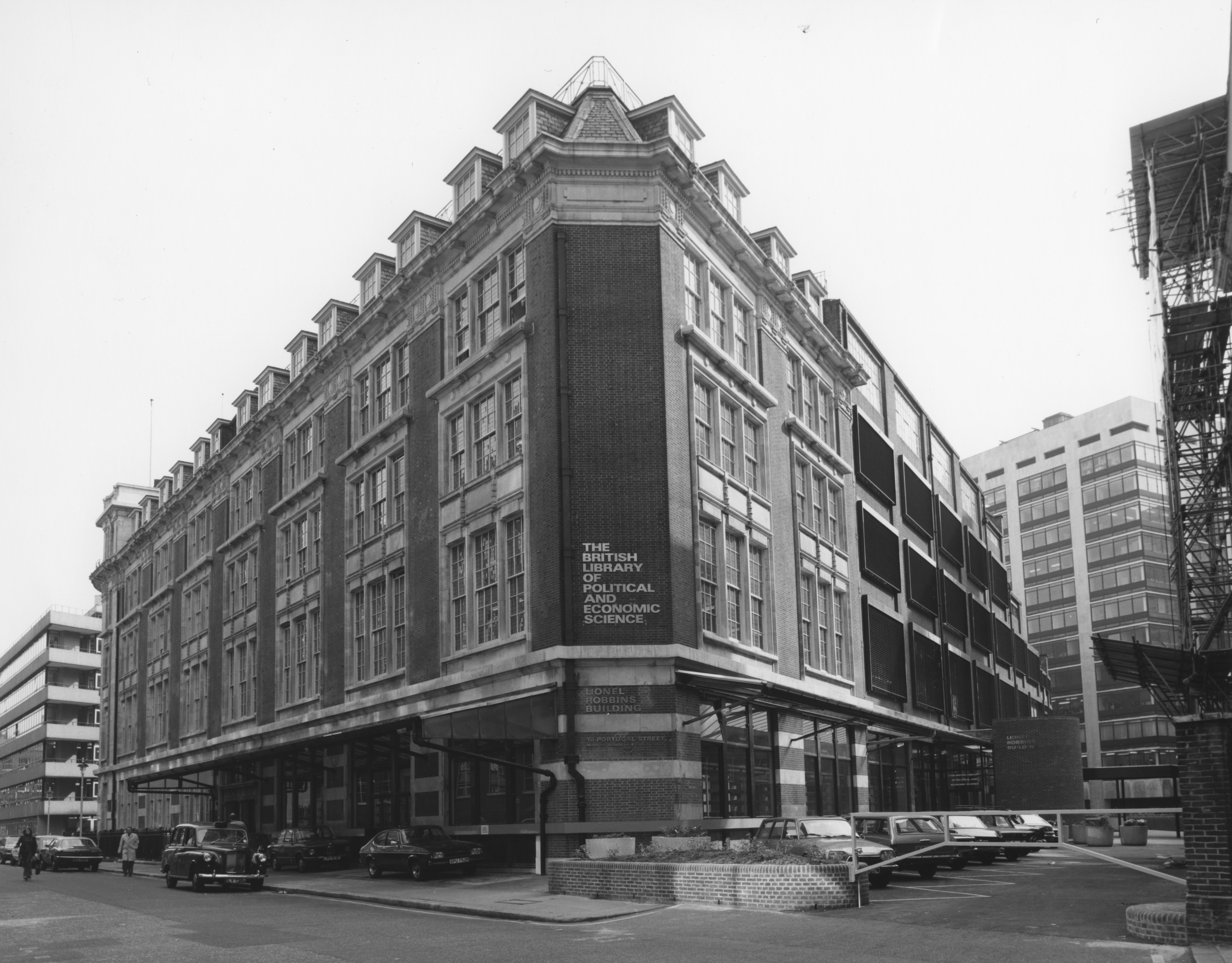
The Lionel Robbins Building, 1978

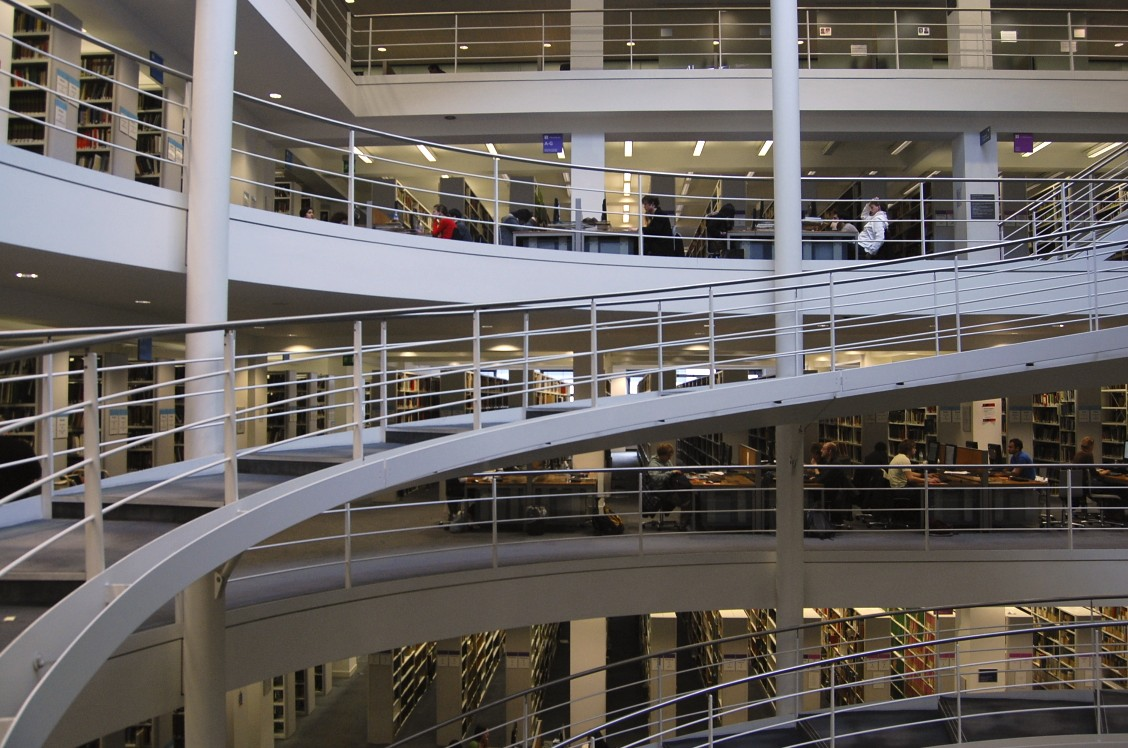
Inside the library, 2008

The library underwent a £35 million building redevelopment in 2000, overseen by Foster and Partners. The building was officially reopened on 27 November 2001 by The Princess Royal and was commended in the 2002 Civic Trust Awards, given to outstanding examples of architecture and environmental design in major city areas of the UK, taking into account the benefit each project brings to its local area as well as the quality of its design. A further redevelopment in summer 2007, saw the expansion of the Course Collection by 60%, a new help desk, more study spaces and an increase in self-service facilities.

The Lionel Robbins Building covers 20,000 square metres, and offers 1,700 study places, including 450 networked PCs and 226 laptop drop-in points. A light-filled atrium, named after Michael Peacock and spiral stepped ramp culminate at the top in a partially glazed dome which has been precisely angled to maximise daylight with minimal solar glare. A reflecting panel on the roof also helps to direct sunlight to the floors below. The dome and other windows respond automatically according to the temperature in the building; ventilating it naturally.

== See also ==
- Women's Library
- Shaw Library
