= Faith Winter (sculptor) =

British sculptor (1927–2017)

- Born: Faith Ashe; 1927; Richmond, London
- Died: 2017 (aged 89–90)
- Education: Guildford School of Art; Chelsea School of Art
- Known for: Sculpture

Faith Winter (née Ashe; 1927–2017) was a British sculptor, notable for the statues and memorials to military and historical figures she created for British towns and cities.

== Biography ==
Winter was born at Richmond outside of London and studied at the Guildford School of Art and the Chelsea School of Art. While a student she won the Feodora Gleichen prize of the Royal Society of Sculptors and had four pieces accepted for exhibition by the Royal Academy in London. Winter married an Army officer, Colonel Freddie Winter, and spent several years travelling and living abroad before returning to England and settling in Surrey in 1973. She received two commissions that established her career as sculptor of portraits and public works. These were a group sculpture of military figures, The Soldiers which is now at the Blandford Camp in Dorset, and a portrait bust of Anne, the Princess Royal. Subsequently, Winter received further commissions for royal portraits and for public statues of military figures, most notably the statues of Hugh Dowding and Arthur Harris outside the church of Saint Clement Danes in London.

Solo exhibitions of works by Winter were held at the Guildford House Gallery, Guildford, in 2002 and in 2005 at Gallery 27. Winter was a member of the Society of Portrait Sculptors and was made a Fellow of the Royal Society of Sculptors in 1983. Winter had three children, two of whom, Alice and David also became artists.

== Selected public works ==
Image	Title / subject	Location and coordinates	Date	Type	Material	Dimensions	Designation	Wikidata	Notes
	Statue of John Ray	Outside Braintree District Museum	1986	Statue on pedestal	Bronze and stone				
More images	Statue of Air Chief Marshal Lord Dowding	Strand, London	1988	Statue on pedestal	Bronze and stone			Q27467134	
More images	Statue of Sir Arthur Harris	Strand, London	1992	Statue on pedestal	Bronze and stone			Q27467279	
More images	Statue of Bishop George Abbot	High Street, Guildford	1993	Statue on pedestal	Bronze and stone				
More images	Statue of General Władysław Sikorski	Portland Place, London	2000	Statue on pedestal	Bronze and stone	4.5m high		Q27464937	
More images	Statue of Sir Frank Whittle	Millennium Place, Coventry	2007	Statue on pedestal	Bronze and stone				

== Other works ==
- A 1992 sculpture of a child holding a carp for the Pearce Memorial fountain at Thame in Oxfordshire.
- Memorial for the Liberation of the Falkland Islands, 1984, Port Stanley
- The 15 Mysteries of the Rosary, 1984, The Church of Our Lady, Queen of Peace, Richmond, London
- Memorial Plaque – Mulberry Harbour Memorial, Arromanches, Normandy
- Spirit of Youth, Dundas Park, Canada.
