= LSE Old Building =

Building in London, England

Coordinates: 51.514097°N 0.116777°W

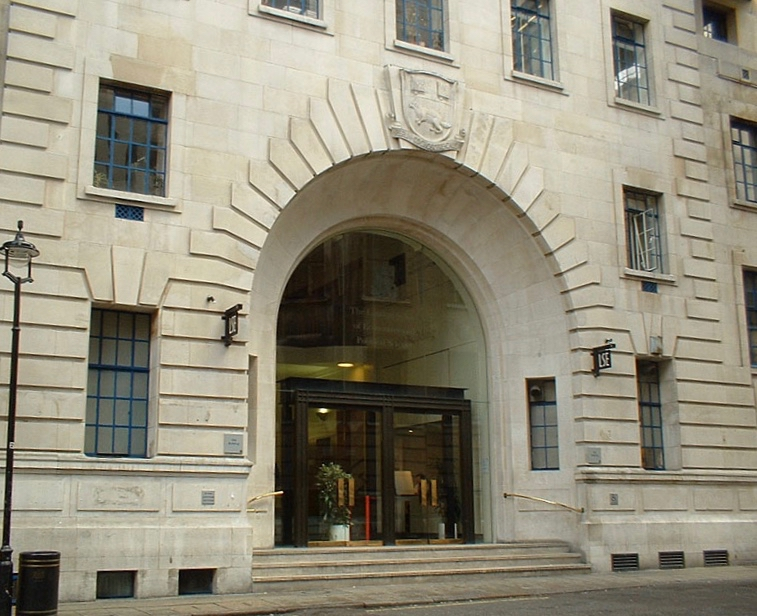
The entrance to the Old Building on Houghton Street

The LSE Old Building is building on Houghton Street off Aldwych in central London that sits roughly in the centre of the London School of Economics's campus. Its construction in the 1920s marked the beginning of the school's expansion.

== Description ==
The building is part of a complex built through the 1920s and 1930s which marked the expansion of LSE. It was built with funds acquired by William Beveride from Beardsley Ruml, the director of the Laura Spelman Rockefeller Memorial Fund. It was built to the designs of Trehearne & Norman who had developed much of the broader Kingsway and Aldwych area. The foundation stone was placed by King George V in 1920 and construction was finished in 1926. It included the Founder's Room on the sixth floor which would host receptions and other events, which is now the Shaw Library.

In the 2014 film Shadow Recruit, Jack Ryan is pictured walking out of the building.

The building was refurbished by Hawkins\Brown in 2024.
