= Emolument.com =

Crowdsourced salary comparison website based in London, England

Emolument
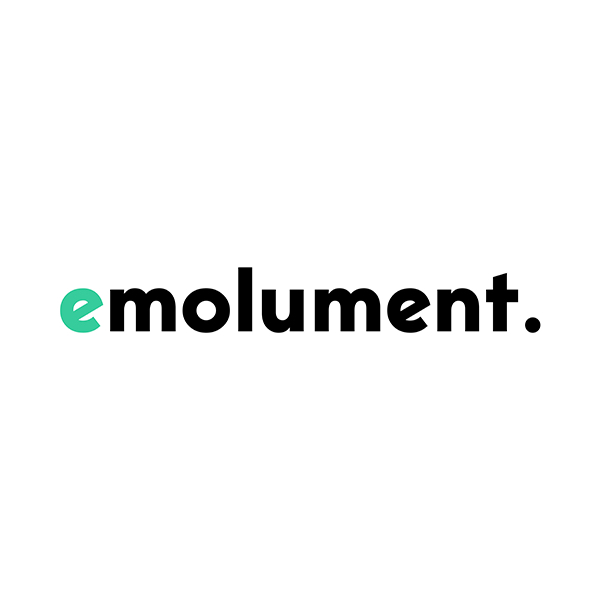
- The Emolument logo
- Type: Private
- Industry: Information technology
- Genre: Salary comparison
- Founded: November 2012
- Founder: Thomas Drewry; Olivier Beau de Loménie; Alice Leguay
- Headquarters: London, United Kingdom
- Area served: Worldwide
- Services: Crowdsourced remuneration data
- Website: www.emolument.com

Emolument is a crowdsourced salary comparison website created in 2012 by Thomas Drewry, Olivier Beau de Loménie and Alice Leguay. It allows its contributors to compare their salary to aggregated entries of other Emolument users, in order to help them negotiate a salary raise, evaluate an offer of employment or change locations.

As of September 2017, Emolument.com had gathered 130,000 entries, each of them automatically and manually verified in order to preserve the accuracy of the data, according to the website.

While Emolument.com is opened to all industries, it is mostly used by Finance, Consultancy and Tech professionals and therefore is often used as a source by newspapers for studies on Banks, Tech firms, or Consultancy companies.

Emolument.com also regularly publishes league tables of best paying universities.

In July 2015, Emolument announced it had raised £1.4 million in funding from 10 angel investors, enabling it to pursue an aggressive user acquisition strategy targeted at financial, technology and professional services globally to further establish Emolument.com, as the leading user-generated remuneration data platform in these sectors.
